= Orbiton =

Quasiparticle in solid state physics

Orbitons are one of three quasiparticles, along with holons and spinons, that electrons in solids are able to split into during the process of spin–charge separation, when extremely tightly confined at temperatures close to absolute zero. The electron can always be theoretically considered as a bound state of the three, with the spinon carrying the spin of the electron, the orbiton carrying the orbital location and the holon carrying the charge, but in certain conditions they can become deconfined and behave as independent particles.

== Overview ==
Orbitons can be thought of as energy stored in an orbital occupancy that can move throughout a material, in other words, an orbital-based excitation. An orbiton propagates through a material as a series of orbital excitations and relaxations of the electrons in a material without changes in either the spin of those electrons or the charge at any point in the material.

Electrons, being of like charge, repel each other. As a result, in order to move past each other in an extremely crowded environment, they are forced to modify their behavior. Research published in July 2009 by the University of Cambridge and the University of Birmingham in England showed that electrons could jump from the surface of a metal onto a closely located quantum wire by quantum tunneling, and upon doing so, will separate into two quasiparticles, named spinons and holons by the researchers.

The orbiton was predicted theoretically by van den Brink, Khomskii and Sawatzky in 1997–1998. Its experimental observation as a separate quasiparticle was reported in paper sent to publishers in September 2011. The research states that firing a beam of X-ray photons at a single electron in a one-dimensional sample of strontium cuprate will excite the electron into a higher orbital, causing the beam to lose a fraction of its energy in the process before it rebounds. In doing so, the electron is separated into a spinon and an orbiton.

== See also ==
- Condensed matter physics
- Tomonaga–Luttinger liquid
