= Fractionalization =

Phenomenon in quantum mechanics

In quantum mechanics, fractionalization is the phenomenon whereby the quasiparticles of a system cannot be constructed as combinations of its elementary constituents. One of the earliest and most prominent examples is the fractional quantum Hall effect, where the constituent particles are electrons but the quasiparticles carry fractions of the electron charge. Fractionalization can be understood as deconfinement of quasiparticles that together are viewed as comprising the elementary constituents. In the case of spin–charge separation, for example, the electron can be viewed as a bound state of a 'spinon' and a 'holon (or chargon)', which under certain conditions can become free to move separately.

== History ==
Quantized Hall conductance was discovered in 1980, related to the electron charge. Laughlin proposed a fluid of fractional charges in 1983, to explain the fractional quantum Hall effect (FQHE) seen in 1982, for which he shared the 1998 Physics Nobel Prize. In 1997, experiments directly observed an electric current of one-third charge. The one-fifth charge was seen in 1999 and various odd fractions have since been detected.

Disordered magnetic materials were later shown to form interesting spin phases. Spin fractionalization was seen in spin ices in 2009 and spin liquids in 2012.

Fractional charges continue to be an active topic in condensed matter physics. Studies of these quantum phases impact understanding of superconductivity, and insulators with surface transport for topological quantum computers.

== Physics ==
Many-body effects in complicated condensed materials lead to emergent properties that can be described as quasiparticles existing in the substance. Electron behavior in solids can be considered as quasi-particle magnons, excitons, holes, and charges with different effective mass. Spinons, chargons, and anyons cannot be considered elementary particle combinations. Different quantum statistics have been seen; Anyons wavefunctions gain a continuous phase in exchange:

$$P(|\Psi_1\rangle|\Psi_2\rangle) = e^{i \theta}|\Psi_2\rangle|\Psi_1\rangle$$

It has been realized many insulators have a conducting surface of 2D quantum electron gas states.

== Systems ==
Solitons in 1D, such as polyacetylene, lead to half charges. Spin-charge separation into spinons and holons was detected in electrons in 1D SrCuO_{2}. Quantum wires with fractional phase behavior have been studied.

Spin liquids with fractional spin excitations occur in frustrated magnetic crystals, like ZnCu_{3}(OH)_{6}Cl_{2}(herbertsmithite), and in α-RuCl_{3}. Fractional spin-1/2 excitations have also been observed in spin-1 quantum spin chains. Spin ice in Dy_{2}Ti_{2}O_{7} and Ho_{2}Ti_{2}O_{7} has fractionalized spin freedom, leading to deconfined magnetic monopoles. They should be contrasted with quasiparticles such as magnons and Cooper pairs, which have quantum numbers that are combinations of the constituents. The most celebrated may be quantum Hall systems, occurring at high magnetic fields in 2D electron gas materials such as GaAs heterostructures. Electrons combined with magnetic flux vortices carry current. Graphene exhibits charge fractionalization.

Attempts have been made to extend fractional behavior to 3D systems. Surface states in topological insulators of various compounds (e.g. tellurium alloys, antimony), and pure metal (bismuth) crystals have been explored for fractionalization signatures.
