= Quantum materials =

Materials whose properties are governed by quantum effects

Quantum materials is an umbrella term in condensed matter physics and materials science for solids whose macroscopic properties are governed by quantum-mechanical effects. These effects cannot be (fully) captured by the single-particle theory of solids. The term groups together materials that were long studied by separate communities: unconventional superconductors, strongly correlated electron systems such as Mott insulators, heavy fermion materials, quantum spin liquids, quantum magnets, and topological materials. A recurring theme is emergence, the appearance of collective phenomena and quasiparticles.

The phrase came into wide use in the 2010s, first as a successor to "strongly correlated electron systems" and then broadened to take in topological matter. Its adoption was driven by large funding programmes and dedicated research centres (e.g. the Quantum Matter Institute at the University of British Columbia or the Department of Quantum Matter Physics at the University of Geneva). Quantum materials are studied both for their fundamental interest and as platforms for quantum technologies, including quantum computing, quantum sensing, spintronics, and low-dissipation electronics.

== History ==
In 2012, Joseph Orenstein published an article in Physics Today about "ultrafast spectroscopy of quantum materials". Orenstein stated,

Quantum materials is a label that has come to signify the area of condensed-matter physics formerly known as strongly correlated electronic systems. Although the field is broad, a unifying theme is the discovery and investigation of materials whose electronic properties cannot be understood with concepts from contemporary condensed-matter textbooks.

As a paradigmatic example, Orenstein refers to the breakdown of Lev Landau's Fermi liquid theory due to strong correlations. The use of the term "quantum materials" has been extended and applied to other systems, such as topological insulators, and Dirac electron materials. The term has gained momentum since the article "The rise of quantum materials" was published in Nature Physics in 2016. Quoting:

on a trivial level all materials exist thanks to the laws of quantum mechanics, and there are cynics who will privately wonder if the description isn't too broad and, well, catchy for its own good. But given the history of condensed-matter physics that we have just outlined, there are good reasons to embrace quantum materials. In essence, they provide a common thread linking disparate communities of researchers working on a variety of problems at the frontiers of physics, materials science and engineering.
