= Spinon =

Quasiparticle in an extremely cold solid

Spinons are one of three quasiparticles, along with holons and orbitons, that electrons in solids are able to split into during the process of spin–charge separation, when extremely tightly confined at temperatures close to absolute zero. The electron can always be theoretically considered as a bound state of the three, with the spinon carrying the spin of the electron, the orbiton carrying the orbital location and the holon carrying the charge, but in certain conditions they can behave as independent quasiparticles.

The term spinon is frequently used in discussions of experimental facts within the framework of both quantum spin liquid and strongly correlated quantum spin liquid.

== Overview ==
Electrons, being of like charge, repel each other. As a result, in order to move past each other in an extremely crowded environment, they are forced to modify their behavior. Research published in July 2009 by the University of Cambridge and the University of Birmingham in England showed that electrons could jump from the surface of the metal onto a closely located quantum wire by quantum tunneling, and upon doing so, will separate into two quasiparticles, named spinons and holons by the researchers.

The orbiton was predicted theoretically by van den Brink, Khomskii and Sawatzky in 1997–1998. Its experimental observation as a separate quasiparticle was reported in paper sent to publishers in September 2011. The research states that by firing a beam of X-ray photons at a single electron in a one-dimensional sample of strontium cuprate, this will excite the electron to a higher orbital, causing the beam to lose a fraction of its energy in the process. In doing so, the electron will be separated into a spinon and an orbiton. This can be traced by observing the energy and momentum of the X-rays before and after the collision.

== See also ==
- Condensed matter physics
- Tomonaga–Luttinger liquid
