= Holon (physics) =

One of three quasiparticles

Holons are one of three quasi-particles, along with spinons and orbitons, that electrons in solids are able to split into during the process of spin–charge separation, when extremely tightly confined at temperatures close to absolute zero. The electron can always be theoretically considered as a bound state of the three, with the spinon carrying the spin of the electron, the orbiton carrying the orbital location and the holon carrying the charge, but in certain conditions they can become deconfined and behave as independent particles.

== Overview ==
Electrons, being fermions, repel each other due to the Pauli exclusion principle. As a result, in order to move past each other in an extremely crowded environment, they are forced to modify their behavior. Research published in July 2009 by the University of Cambridge and the University of Birmingham in Britain showed that electrons could jump past each other by quantum tunneling, and in order to do so will separate into two particles, named spinons and holons by the researchers.

== General References ==
Merali, Zeeya (Apr 18, 2012). "Not-quite-so elementary, my dear electron". Nature. Springer Nature. doi:10.1038/nature.2012.10471. ISSN 1476-4687.

== See also ==
- Condensed matter physics
- Tomonaga–Luttinger liquid
