= Strongly correlated material =

Materials with electrical properties that cannot be explained by non-interacting entities

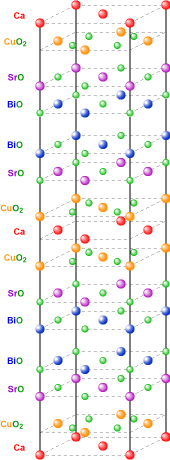
The perovskite structure of BSCCO, a high-temperature superconductor and a strongly correlated material.

Strongly correlated materials are a wide class of compounds that include insulators and electronic materials, and show unusual (often technologically useful) electronic and magnetic properties, such as metal-insulator transitions, heavy fermion behavior, half-metallicity, and spin-charge separation. The essential feature that defines these materials is that the behavior of their electrons or spinons cannot be described effectively in terms of non-interacting entities. Theoretical models of the electronic (fermionic) structure of strongly correlated materials must include electronic (fermionic) correlation to be accurate. As of recently, the label quantum materials is also used to refer to strongly correlated materials, among others.

== Transition metal oxides ==
Many transition metal oxides belong to this class which may be subdivided according to their behavior, e.g. high-T_{c}, spintronic materials, multiferroics, Mott insulators, spin-Peierls materials, heavy fermion materials, quasi-low-dimensional materials, etc. The single most intensively studied effect is probably high-temperature superconductivity in doped cuprates, e.g. La_{2−x}Sr_{x}CuO_{4}. Other ordering or magnetic phenomena and temperature-induced phase transitions in many transition-metal oxides are also gathered under the term "strongly correlated materials."

== Electronic structures ==
Typically, strongly correlated materials have incompletely filled d- or f-electron shells with narrow energy bands. One can no longer consider any electron in the material as being in a "sea" of the averaged motion of the others (also known as mean field theory). Each single electron has a complex influence on its neighbors.

The term strong correlation refers to behavior of electrons in solids that is not well-described (often not even in a qualitatively correct manner) by simple one-electron theories such as the local-density approximation (LDA) of density-functional theory or Hartree–Fock theory. For instance, the seemingly simple material NiO has a partially filled 3d band (the Ni atom has 8 of 10 possible 3d-electrons) and therefore would be expected to be a good conductor. However, strong Coulomb repulsion (a correlation effect) between d electrons makes NiO instead a wide-band gap insulator. Thus, strongly correlated materials have electronic structures that are neither simply free-electron-like nor completely ionic, but a mixture of both.

== Theories ==
Extensions to the LDA (LDA+U, GGA, SIC, GW, etc.) as well as simplified models Hamiltonians (e.g. Hubbard-like models) have been proposed and developed in order to describe phenomena that are due to strong electron correlation. Among them, dynamical mean field theory (DMFT) successfully captures the main features of correlated materials. Schemes that use both LDA and DMFT explain many experimental results in the field of correlated electrons.

== Structural studies ==
Experimentally, optical spectroscopy, high-energy electron spectroscopies, resonant photoemission, and more recently resonant inelastic (hard and soft) X-ray scattering (RIXS) and neutron spectroscopy have been used to study the electronic and magnetic structure of strongly correlated materials. Spectral signatures seen by these techniques that are not explained by one-electron density of states are often related to strong correlation effects. The experimentally obtained spectra can be compared to predictions of certain models or may be used to establish constraints on the parameter sets. One has for instance established a classification scheme of transition metal oxides within the so-called Zaanen–Sawatzky–Allen diagram.

== Applications ==
The manipulation and use of correlated phenomena has applications like superconducting magnets and in magnetic storage (CMR) technologies. Other phenomena like the metal-insulator transition in VO_{2} have been explored as a means to make smart windows to reduce the heating/cooling requirements of a room. Furthermore, metal-insulator transitions in Mott insulating materials like LaTiO_{3} can be tuned through adjustments in band filling to potentially be used to make transistors that would use conventional field effect transistor configurations to take advantage of the material's sharp change in conductivity. Transistors using metal-insulator transitions in Mott insulators are often referred to as Mott transistors, and have been successfully fabricated using VO_{2} before, but they have required the larger electric fields induced by ionic liquids as a gate material to operate.

== See also ==
- Electronic correlation
- Emergent behavior
