= Bosonization =

Mechanism in 1+1 dimensional field theories

In theoretical condensed matter physics and quantum field theory, bosonization is a mathematical procedure by which a system of interacting fermions in (1+1) dimensions can be transformed to a system of massless, non-interacting bosons. The method of bosonization was conceived independently by particle physicists Sidney Coleman and Stanley Mandelstam and condensed matter physicists Daniel C. Mattis and Alan Luther in 1975.

In particle physics, however, the boson is interacting (cf. the Sine-Gordon model), and notably through topological interactions (cf. the Wess–Zumino–Witten model).

The basic physical idea behind bosonization is that particle-hole excitations are bosonic in character. However, it was shown by Sin-Itiro Tomonaga in 1950 that this principle is only valid in one-dimensional systems. Bosonization is an effective field theory that focuses on low-energy excitations.

== Mathematical descriptions ==
A pair of chiral fermions $\psi_+,\bar\psi_+$, one being the conjugate variable of the other, can be described in terms of a chiral boson $\phi$
$$\psi_+ = :\exp\left(+i\int^z_\infty\partial_{++}\phi\right):,\qquad \bar\psi_+ = :\exp\left(-i\int^z_{\infty}\partial_{++}\phi\right):$$
where the currents of these two models are related by
$$\partial_{++}\phi=:\bar\psi_+\psi_+:$$
where composite operators must be defined by a regularization and a subsequent renormalization.

== Examples ==
=== In particle physics ===
The standard example in particle physics, for a Dirac field in (1+1) dimensions, is the equivalence between the massive Thirring model (MTM) and the quantum Sine-Gordon model. Sidney Coleman showed the Thirring model is S-dual to the sine-Gordon model. The fundamental fermions of the Thirring model correspond to the solitons (bosons) of the sine-Gordon model.

=== In condensed matter ===
The Luttinger liquid model, proposed by Tomonaga and reformulated by J.M. Luttinger, describes electrons in one-dimensional electrical conductors under second-order interactions. Daniel C. Mattis and Elliott H. Lieb proved in 1965 that electrons could be modeled as bosonic interactions. The response of the electron density to an external perturbation can be treated as plasmonic waves. This model predicts the emergence of spin–charge separation.

== See also ==
- Holstein–Primakoff transformation
