= Kugel–Khomskii coupling =

Kugel–Khomskii coupling describes a coupling between the spin and orbital degrees of freedom in a solid; it is named after the Russian physicists Kliment I. Kugel (Климент Ильич Кугель) and Daniel I. Khomskii (Daniil I. Khomskii, Даниил Ильич Хомский). The Hamiltonian used is:

$$H=\frac{t^2}{U}\sum_{\langle i,j\rangle}\left[4\left(\overrightarrow{S_i}\cdot\overrightarrow{S_j}\right)\left(\tau_i^{\alpha}-\frac{1}{2}\right)\left(\tau_j^{\alpha}-\frac{1}{2}\right)
+\left(\tau_i^{\alpha}+\frac{1}{2}\right)\left(\tau_j^{\alpha}+\frac{1}{2}\right)-1\right].$$
