= Jeroen van den Brink =

German theoretical physicist

Jeroen van den Brink (born November 18, 1968) is a theoretical condensed matter physicist, director at the Leibniz Institute for Solid State and Materials Research, IFW Dresden and professor at the Dresden University of Technology in Germany. Van den Brink is known for contributions to the field of strongly correlated materials, in particular for proposals on magnetic and orbital ordering, mechanisms for multiferroicity and the theory of Resonant Inelastic X-Ray Scattering (RIXS).

He obtained a PhD from the University of Groningen in 1997 under the supervision of George A. Sawatzky and Daniel Khomskii. From 2002–2009, he was a professor of theoretical condensed matter physics working at Leiden University and in 2009 visiting professor at the Stanford Institute for Materials and Energy Science.
