= Spin–charge separation =

Behavior of electrons in condensed matter physics

In condensed matter physics, spin–charge separation is an unusual behavior of electrons in some materials in which they 'split' into three independent particles, the spinon, the orbiton and the holon (or chargon). The electron can always be theoretically considered as a bound state of the three, with the spinon carrying the spin of the electron, the orbiton carrying the orbital degree of freedom and the chargon carrying the charge, but in certain conditions they can behave as independent quasiparticles.

The theory of spin–charge separation originates with the work of Sin-Itiro Tomonaga who developed an approximate method for treating one-dimensional interacting quantum systems in 1950. This was then developed by Joaquin Mazdak Luttinger in 1963 with an exactly solvable model which demonstrated spin–charge separation. In 1981 F. Duncan M. Haldane generalized Luttinger's model to the Tomonaga–Luttinger liquid concept whereby the physics of Luttinger's model was shown theoretically to be a general feature of all one-dimensional metallic systems. Although Haldane treated spinless fermions, the extension to spin-½ fermions and associated spin–charge separation was so clear that the promised follow-up paper did not appear.

Spin–charge separation is one of the most unusual manifestations of the concept of quasiparticles. This property is counterintuitive, because neither the spinon, with zero charge and spin half, nor the chargon, with charge minus one and zero spin, can be constructed as combinations of the electrons, holes, phonons and photons that are the constituents of the system. It is an example of fractionalization, the phenomenon in which the quantum numbers of the quasiparticles are not multiples of those of the elementary particles, but fractions.

Schematic depicting spin-charge separation in one dimension in subsequent rows: A removed (electron) results in a hole, which can be filled by a neighboring spin. However, this creates a domain wall (grey line). By motion of one electron to the left and filling of the vacancy, the hole effectively moves to the right. The spin of the domain wall and the charge of the hole are separated.

The same theoretical ideas have been applied in the framework of ultracold atoms. In a two-component Bose gas in 1D, strong interactions can produce a maximal form of spin–charge separation.

== Observation ==
Building on physicist F. Duncan M. Haldane's 1981 theory, experts from the Universities of Cambridge and Birmingham proved experimentally in 2009 that a mass of electrons artificially confined in a small space together will split into spinons and holons due to the intensity of their mutual repulsion (from having the same charge). A team of researchers working at the Advanced Light Source (ALS) of the U.S. Department of Energy's Lawrence Berkeley National Laboratory observed the peak spectral structures of spin–charge separation three years prior.
