= Richard Laming =

British surgeon and polymath

Richard Laming (17 August 1799–3 May 1879) was a British surgeon, natural philosopher, inventor, chemist and industrialist.

There is some uncertainty about his origins. It is believed that he was born in Margate, England as the son of James Laming, a packet boat owner, and Sarah Walton. He had an elder brother James, born 1791, who was a prosperous merchant. In 1825, Richard qualified for membership of the Royal College of Surgeons, and he established a practice in London.

During his leisure moments, Richard developed an interest in the theory of electricity. Between 1838 and 1851 he published a series of papers speculating about the electrical makeup of atoms. He hypothesized that there existed sub-atomic particles of unit charge; one of the first persons ever to do so. He suggested that the atom was made up of a core of material surrounded by concentric shells of these electrical 'atoms', or particles. He also believed that these particles could be added or subtracted to an atom, changing its charge.

Around 1844, he suggested a mechanism for an insulator as an atom surrounded by "perfect external spherical strata" of electrical particles. He also supposed that chemical reactions could occur when two atoms share an electrical charge. However, perhaps because he provided no experimental backing for his ideas, he received little interest from the Royal Society.

In 1838 he moved to Paris, where he remained for about a decade. There his ideas also received little interest and he was regarded as eccentric. His medical practice apparently ended some time around 1842. When he returned to England his interests leaned toward chemistry, and began working in the coal-gas industry.

He applied for several patents:

- 1844, for improvements in the purification and application of ammonia.
- 1847, for a continuous recuperator made of iron tubes, which may be the oldest such device known.
- 1850, for improvements in the manufacture of gas for illumination and other purposes to which coal gas is applicable.
- 1850, for the Laming process, which was a method of removing hydrogen sulfide and carbon dioxide from coal gas.
- 1861, Improvements in manufacturing alkaline carbonates.

During the 1860s, he apparently became interested in the telegraph and he applied for two patents for improvements to the device. He retired around 1865 to live along the south coast of England. He died on 3 May 1879 in Arundel, Sussex. He was twice married and had at least two sons.

== Bibliography ==
- Laming, Richard (1838). On the Primary Forces of Electricity. Location.
- Laming, R. (1845). "Observations on a Paper by Prof. Faraday Concerning Electrical Conduction and the Nature of Matter". Philosophical Magazine. 27 (2): 420–423. doi:10.1080/14786444508646245.
- Laming, Richard (1851). Matter and Force: An Analytical and Synthetical Essay on Physical Causation. R. Taylor.
- Laming, Richard (1858). A New View of Electrical Action. Taylor and Francis.
- Laming, Richard (1873). God in second causes: a physical principia.
- Laming, Richard (1874). The Spirituality of Causation: A Scientific Hypothesis. London: Williams and Norgate.
