= Herbertsmithite =

Halide mineral

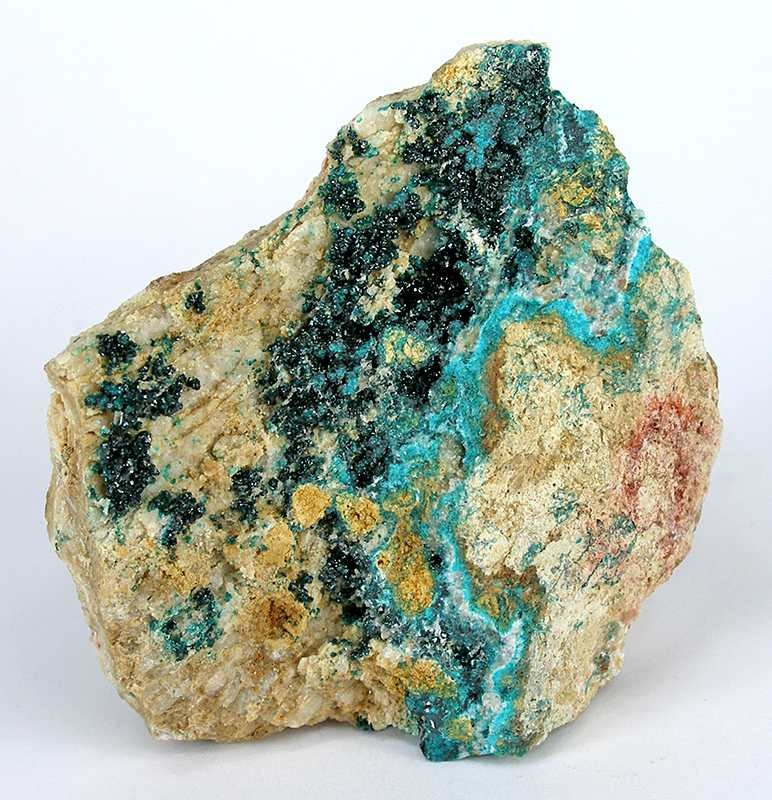
- Herbertsmithite from Caracoles, Sierra Gorda District, Tocopilla Province, Chile (size: 4.5 × 4.4 × 2.7 cm)

General
- Category: Halide mineral
- Formula: ZnCu_{3}(OH)_{6}Cl_{2}
- IMA symbol: Her
- Strunz classification: 3.DA.10c
- Crystal system: Trigonal
- Crystal class: Hexagonal scalenohedral (3̅m); H-M symbol: (3̅ 2/m)
- Space group: R3̅m
- Unit cell: a = 6.834 Å c = 14.075 Å; Z = 3

Identification
- Color: Light green, blue-green
- Crystal habit: Aggregates of rhombohedral crystals
- Cleavage: Good on {101̅1}
- Tenacity: Brittle
- Mohs scale hardness: 3–3.5
- Luster: Vitreous to adamantine
- Streak: Light green
- Diaphaneity: Transparent
- Specific gravity: 3.75–3.95
- Optical properties: Uniaxial (−)
- Refractive index: n_{ε} 1.817, n_{ω} 1.825
- Birefringence: 0.0080

Herbertsmithite is a rhombohedral green-coloured mineral with chemical formula ZnCu_{3}(OH)_{6}Cl_{2}. It is named after the mineralogist Herbert Smith (1872–1953) and was first found in 1972 in Chile. It is polymorphous with kapellasite and closely related to paratacamite. Herbertsmithite has also been found near Anarak, Iran, hence its other name, anarakite.

Herbertsmithite is associated with copper mineralization in syenitic porphyries and granites in Chile and in Triassic dolomite formations in Iran. It has also been reported from the Osborn District in the Big Horn Mountains of Maricopa County, Arizona and the Lavrion District Mines of Attica, Greece.

Herbertsmithite has a vitreous luster and is fairly transparent with a light-green to blue-green color. Herbertsmithite has a Mohs hardness of between 3 and 3.5. The crystal's density is 3.95 g/cm^{3}.

In 2012, the pure synthetic form of herbertsmithite was discovered to be able to exhibit the properties of a quantum spin liquid, due to its Kagome lattice structure. Herbertsmithite is the first mineral known to exhibit this unique state of magnetism: it is neither a ferromagnet with mostly aligned atomic scale magnetic moments, nor is it an antiferromagnet with mostly opposed adjacent magnetic moments; rather its magnetic moments have constantly fluctuating orientations.

Optical conductivity observations suggest the magnetic state in herbertsmithite is a type of emergent gauge field of a gapless U(1) Dirac spin liquid. Other experiments and some calculations suggest instead that it is a $\mathbb{Z}_2$ spin liquid.
