= Daniel Khomskii =

German physicist (1938–2024)

- Даниил Хомский
- Born: Даниил Ильич Хомский; 18 September 1938; Leningrad, Russian SFSR, USSR
- Died: 12 August 2024 (aged 85)
- Scientific career
- Fields: Theoretical physics
- Institutions: Russian Academy of Science; Rijksuniversiteit Groningen; Universität Köln

Daniel Ilyich Khomskii (Russian: Даниил Ильич Хомский; 18 September 1938 – 12 August 2024) was a Soviet-born German physicist.

== Life and career ==
Khomskii graduated from Moscow State University in 1962. Starting in 1965, he worked in the Theoretical Department of the Lebedev Physical Institute of the Russian Academy of Science in Moscow. He achieved a PhD in 1969. In 1980, he obtained a second doctoral degree – the Russian equivalent to the German Habilitation or a professorship in the United States. From 1992 to 2003, he was a professor at Groningen University in the Netherlands, and from 2003, he was a guest professor in Köln (Cologne University) in Germany.

His main research interests were the theory of systems with strongly correlated electrons, metal-insulator transitions, magnetism, orbital ordering (Kugel-Khomskii model) and superconductivity. He was elected a Fellow of the American Physical Society in 2008, and published roughly 300 papers over the course of his career.

Khomskii died on 12 August 2024, at the age of 85.
