= Wilson ratio =

Ratio of magnetic susceptibility to specific heat term

The Wilson ratio of a metal is the dimensionless ratio of the zero-temperature magnetic susceptibility to the coefficient of the linear temperature term in the electronic specific heat. The relative value of the Wilson ratio, compared to the Wilson ratio for the non-interacting Fermi gas, can provide insight into the types of interactions present.

== Applications ==
=== Fermi liquid theory ===
The Wilson ratio can be used to characterize strongly correlated Fermi liquids. The Fermi liquid theory explains the behaviour of metals at very low temperatures. Two important features of a metal which obey this theory are:

1. At temperatures much below the Fermi temperature the specific heat is proportional to the temperature
2. The magnetic susceptibility is independent of temperature

Both of these quantities, however, are proportional to the electronic density of states at the Fermi energy. Their ratio is a dimensionless quantity called the Wilson (or the Sommerfeld-Wilson) ratio, defined as:

$$R_\mathrm{w}=\frac{4}{3}\pi^2k_B^2T\chi_\mathrm{P}/\mu_0(g\mu_B)^2C_\mathrm{elec}$$

After substituting the values of χ_{P} (Pauli susceptibility) and C_{elec} (electronic contribution to specific heat), obtained using Sommerfeld theory, the value obtained for R_{w} in the case of a free electron gas is 1.

In the case of real Fermi-liquid metals, the ratio can differ significantly from 1. The difference arises due to electron-electron interactions within the system. These tend to change the effective electronic mass, which affects both specific heat and magnetic susceptibility. Whether or not this increase in both is given by the same multiplicative factor is shown by the Wilson ratio. In some cases, electron-electron interactions give rise to an additional increase in susceptibility.

The converse is also true, i.e. a deviation of the experimental value of R_{w} from 1 may indicate strong electronic correlations. Very high Wilson ratios (above 2) indicate nearness to ferromagnetism.

== See also ==
- Fermi liquid theory
- Heavy fermion
- Kadowaki-Woods ratio
- Wiedemann–Franz law
