= Distrontium ruthenate =

- The unit cell of the layered perovskite structure of strontium ruthenate. Ruthenium ions are red, strontium ions are blue, and oxygen ions are green.

Identifiers
CAS Number	60862-59-1
3D model (JSmol)	Interactive image
- InChI: InChI=1S/4O.Ru.2Sr/q4*-1;+4;2*+2 Key: KWNWXODLYNPAJR-UHFFFAOYSA-N
- SMILES: [Sr+2].[Sr+2].[O-][Ru]([O-])([O-])[O-]

Properties
Chemical formula	Sr_{2}RuO_{4}

Structure
Crystal structure	K_{2}NiF_{4} structure (body-centered tetragonal)
Lattice constant	a = 387 pm, c = 1274 pm
- Except where otherwise noted, data are given for materials in their standard state (at 25 °C [77 °F], 100 kPa). Infobox references

Distrontium ruthenate, also known as strontium ruthenate, is an oxide of strontium and ruthenium with the chemical formula Sr_{2}RuO_{4}. It was the first reported perovskite superconductor that did not contain copper. Strontium ruthenate is structurally very similar to the high-temperature cuprate superconductors, and in particular, is almost identical to the lanthanum doped superconductor (La, Sr)_{2}CuO_{4}. However, the transition temperature for the superconducting phase transition is 0.93 K (about 1.5 K for the best sample), which is much lower than the corresponding value for cuprates.

== Superconductivity ==
Superconductivity in Sr_{2}RuO_{4} was first observed by Yoshiteru Maeno et al. Unlike the cuprate superconductors, SRO displays superconductivity in the absence of doping. It has been suggested that the superconducting order parameter in SRO exhibits signatures of time-reversal symmetry breaking, however this experimental result has not been independently confirmed. For several probes which previously showed evidence of time reversal symmetry breaking (NMR/Knight Shift, μSR), the measurements were later demonstrated to contain artifacts which when corrected for point to a singlet order parameter. Therefore, currently the majority of experimental results suggests that it is a superconductor with a singlet order parameter but potentially still an unconventional superconductor with a pairing symmetry other than s-wave (for example d-wave).

Strontium ruthenate behaves as a conventional Fermi liquid at temperatures below 25 K.

Sr_{2}RuO_{4} is believed to be a fairly two-dimensional system, with superconductivity occurring primarily on the Ru-O plane. The electronic structure of Sr_{2}RuO_{4} is characterized by three bands derived from the Ru t_{2g} 4d orbitals often called α, β and γ bands, of which the first is hole-like while the other two are electron-like. Among them, the γ band arises mainly from the d_{xy} orbital, while the α and β bands emerge from the hybridization of d_{xz} and d_{yz} orbitals. Due to the two-dimensionality of Sr_{2}RuO_{4}, its Fermi surface consists of three nearly two-dimensional sheets with little dispersion along the crystalline c-axis and that the compound is nearly magnetic.

Early proposals suggested that superconductivity is dominant in the γ band. In particular, the candidate chiral p-wave order parameter in the momentum space exhibits k-dependent phase winding which is characteristic of time-reversal symmetry breaking. This peculiar single-band superconducting order is expected to give rise to appreciable spontaneous supercurrent at the edge of the sample. Such an effect is closely associated with the topology of the Hamiltonian describing Sr_{2}RuO_{4} in the superconducting state, which is characterized by a nonzero Chern number. However, scanning probes have so far failed to detect expected time-reversal symmetry breaking fields generated by the supercurrent, off by orders of magnitude. This has led some to speculate that superconductivity arises dominantly from the α and β bands instead. Such a two-band superconductor, although having k-dependence phase winding in its order parameters on the two relevant bands, is topologically trivial with the two bands featuring opposite Chern numbers. Therefore, it could possibly give a much reduced if not completely cancelled supercurrent at the edge. However, this naive reasoning was later found not to be entirely correct: the magnitude of edge current is not directly related to the topological property of the chiral state. In particular, although the non-trivial topology is expected to give rise to protected chiral edge states, due to U(1) symmetry-breaking the edge current is not a protected quantity. In fact, it has been shown that the edge current vanishes identically for any higher angular momentum chiral pairing states which feature even larger Chern numbers, such as chiral d-, f-wave etc.

T_{c} seems to increase under uniaxial compression that pushes the van Hove singularity of the d_{xy} orbital across the Fermi level.

Evidence was reported for d-wave singlet state as in cuprates and some heavy fermion superconductors, instead of the conjectured more unconventional p-wave triplet state.

More recently, it has been suggested that Strontium ruthenate hosts a Fulde–Ferrell–Larkin–Ovchinnikov phase. These results have however not been independently confirmed so far.

In 2023, a team of researchers from the University of Illinois Urbana-Champaign confirmed the 67-year-old prediction of Pines' demon excitation in Sr_{2}RuO_{4}.

== See also ==
- Uranium ditelluride
- Dicalcium ruthenate
