= Heavy fermion superconductor =

Heavy fermion superconductors are a type of unconventional superconductor.

The first heavy fermion superconductor, CeCu_{2}Si_{2}, was discovered by Frank Steglich in 1978.

Since then over 30 heavy fermion superconductors were found (in materials based on Ce, U, but also other lanthanide and actinide elements), with a critical temperature up to 18.5 K (in PuCoGa_{5}).

Material	T_{C} (K)	comments	original reference
CeCu_{2}Si_{2}	0.7	first unconventional superconductor	
CeCoIn_{5}	2.3	highest T_{C} of all Ce-based heavy fermions	
CePt_{3}Si	0.75	first heavy-fermion superconductor with non-centrosymmetric crystal structure	
CeIn_{3}	0.2	superconducting only at high pressures	
UBe_{13}	0.85	p-wave superconductor	
UPt_{3}	0.48	several distinct superconducting phases	
URu_{2}Si_{2}	1.3	mysterious 'hidden-order phase' below 17 K	
UPd_{2}Al_{3}	2.0	antiferromagnetic below 14 K	
UNi_{2}Al_{3}	1.1	antiferromagnetic below 5 K	
NpPd_{5}Al_{2}	4.9		
PuCoGa_{5}	18.5		

Heavy fermion materials are intermetallic compounds, containing rare earth or actinide elements. The f-electrons of these atoms hybridize with the normal conduction electrons leading to quasiparticles with an enhanced effective mass.

From specific heat measurements $\Delta C/C(T_{\rm C})$ one knows that the Cooper pairs in the superconducting state are also formed by the heavy quasiparticles. In contrast to normal superconductors it cannot be described by BCS theory. Due to the large effective mass, the Fermi velocity is reduced and comparable to the inverse Debye frequency. This leads to the failing of the picture of electrons polarizing the lattice as an attractive force.

Some heavy fermion superconductors are candidate materials for the Fulde-Ferrell-Larkin-Ovchinnikov (FFLO) phase. In particular there has been evidence that CeCoIn_{5} close to the critical field is in an FFLO state.
