= Heavy fermion material =

Intermetallic compound with 4f and 5f electrons in unfilled electron bands

In materials science, heavy fermion materials are a specific type of intermetallic compound, containing elements with 4f or 5f electrons in unfilled electron bands. Electrons are one type of fermion, and when they are found in such materials, they are sometimes referred to as heavy electrons. Heavy fermion materials have a low-temperature specific heat whose linear term is up to 1,000 times larger than the value expected from the free electron model. The properties of the heavy fermion compounds often derive from the partly filled f-orbitals of rare-earth or actinide ions, which behave like localized magnetic moments.

The name "heavy fermion" comes from the fact that the fermion behaves as if it has an effective mass greater than its rest mass. In the case of electrons, below a characteristic temperature (typically 10 K), the conduction electrons in these metallic compounds behave as if they had an effective mass up to 1,000 times the free particle mass. This large effective mass is also reflected in a large contribution to the resistivity from electron-electron scattering via the Kadowaki–Woods ratio. Heavy fermion behavior has been found in a broad variety of states including metallic, superconducting, insulating and magnetic states. Characteristic examples are CeCu_{6}, CeAl_{3}, CeCu_{2}Si_{2}, YbAl_{3}, UBe_{13} and UPt_{3}.

== Historical overview ==
Heavy fermion behavior was discovered by K. Andres, J.E. Graebner and H.R. Ott in 1975, who observed enormous magnitudes of the linear specific heat capacity in CeAl_{3}.

While investigations on doped superconductors led to the conclusion that the existence of localized magnetic moments and superconductivity in one material was incompatible, the opposite was shown, when in 1979 Frank Steglich et al. discovered heavy fermion superconductivity in the material CeCu_{2}Si_{2}.

In 1994, the discovery of a quantum critical point and non-Fermi liquid behavior in the phase diagram of heavy fermion compounds by H. von Löhneysen et al. led to a new rise of interest in the research of these compounds. Another experimental breakthrough was the demonstration in 1998 (by the group of Gil Lonzarich) that quantum criticality in heavy fermions can be the reason for unconventional superconductivity.

Heavy fermion materials play an important role in current scientific research, acting as prototypical materials for unconventional superconductivity, non-Fermi liquid behavior and quantum criticality. The actual interaction between localized magnetic moments and conduction electrons in heavy fermion compounds is still not completely understood and a topic of ongoing investigation.

== Properties ==
Heavy fermion materials belong to the group of strongly correlated electron systems.

Several members of the group of heavy fermion materials become superconducting below a critical temperature. The superconductivity is unconventional, i.e., not covered by BCS theory.

At high temperatures, heavy fermion compounds behave like normal metals and the electrons can be described as a Fermi gas, in which the electrons are assumed to be non-interacting fermions. In this case, the interaction between the f electrons, which present a local magnetic moment, and the conduction electrons can be neglected.

The Fermi liquid theory of Lev Landau provides a good model to describe the properties of most heavy fermion materials at low temperatures. In this theory, the electrons are described by quasiparticles, which have the same quantum numbers and charge, but the interaction of the electrons is taken into account by introducing an effective mass, which differs from the actual mass of a free electron.

=== Optical properties ===
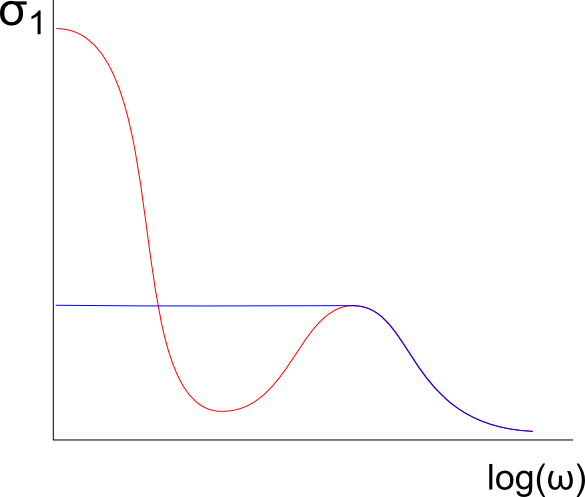
Typical frequency-dependent optical conductivity of a heavy fermion compound. Blue line: T > T_{coh}. Red line: T < T_{coh}.

In order to obtain the optical properties of heavy fermion systems, these materials have been investigated by optical spectroscopy measurements. In these experiments the sample is irradiated by electromagnetic waves with tunable wavelength. Measuring the reflected or transmitted light reveals the characteristic energies of the sample.

Above the characteristic coherence temperature $T_{\rm coh}$, heavy fermion materials behave like normal metals; i.e. their optical response is described by the Drude model. Compared to a good metal however, heavy fermion compounds at high temperatures have a high scattering rate because of the large density of local magnetic moments (at least one f electron per unit cell), which cause (incoherent) Kondo scattering. Due to the high scattering rate, the conductivity for dc and at low frequencies is rather low. A conductivity roll-off (Drude roll-off) occurs at the frequency that corresponds to the relaxation rate.

Below $T_{\rm coh}$, the localized f electrons hybridize with the conduction electrons. This leads to the enhanced effective mass, and a hybridization gap develops. In contrast to Kondo insulators, the chemical potential of heavy fermion compounds lies within the conduction band. These changes lead to two important features in the optical response of heavy fermions.

The frequency-dependent conductivity of heavy-fermion materials can be expressed by $\sigma(\omega)=\frac{ne^2}{m^*}\frac{\tau^*}{1+\omega^2\tau^{*2}}$, containing the effective mass $m^*$ and the renormalized relaxation rate $\frac{1}{\tau^*}=\frac{m}{m^*}\frac{1}{\tau}$. Due to the large effective mass, the renormalized relaxation time is also enhanced, leading to a narrow Drude roll-off at very low frequencies compared to normal metals. The lowest such Drude relaxation rate observed in heavy fermions so far, in the low GHz range, was found in UPd_{2}Al_{3}.

The gap-like feature in the optical conductivity represents directly the hybridization gap, which opens due to the interaction of localized f electrons and conduction electrons. Since the conductivity does not vanish completely, the observed gap is actually a pseudogap. At even higher frequencies we can observe a local maximum in the optical conductivity due to normal interband excitations.

== Heat capacity ==
=== Specific heat for normal metals ===
At low temperature and for normal metals, the specific heat $C_P$ consists of the specific heat of the electrons $C_{P, \rm el}$ which depends linearly on temperature $T$ and of the specific heat of the crystal lattice vibrations (phonons) $C_{P, \rm ph}$ which depends cubically on temperature

$$C_P = C_{P, \rm el}+C_{P,\rm ph} = \gamma T + \beta T^3 \$$

with proportionality constants $\beta$ and $\gamma$.

In the temperature range mentioned above, the electronic contribution is the major part of the specific heat. In the free electron model — a simple model system that neglects electron interaction — or metals that could be described by it, the electronic specific heat is given by

$$C_{P, \rm el} = \gamma T = \frac{\pi^2}{2}\frac{k_{\rm B}}{\epsilon_{\rm F}}nk_{\rm B}T$$

with Boltzmann constant $k_{\rm B}$, the electron density $n$ and the Fermi energy $\epsilon_{\rm F}$ (the highest single particle energy of occupied electronic states). The proportionality constant $\gamma$ is called the Sommerfeld coefficient.

=== Relation between heat capacity and "thermal effective mass" ===
For electrons with a quadratic dispersion relation (as for the free-electron gas), the Fermi energy ε_{F} is inversely proportional to the particle's mass m:

$$\epsilon_{\rm F} = \frac{\hbar^2 k_{\rm F}^2}{2m}$$

where $k_{\rm F}$ stands for the Fermi wave number that depends on the electron density and is the absolute value of the wave number of the highest occupied electron state. Thus, because the Sommerfeld parameter $\gamma$ is inversely proportional to $\epsilon_{\rm F}$, $\gamma$ is proportional to the particle's mass and for high values of $\gamma$, the metal behaves as a Fermi gas in which the conduction electrons have a high thermal effective mass.

=== Example: UBe_{13} at low temperatures ===
Experimental results for the specific heat of the heavy fermion compound UBe_{13} show a peak at a temperature around 0.75 K that goes down to zero with a high slope if the temperature approaches 0 K. Due to this peak, the $\gamma$ factor is much higher than the free electron model in this temperature range. In contrast, above 6 K, the specific heat for this heavy fermion compound approaches the value expected from free-electron theory.

== Quantum criticality ==
The presence of local moment and delocalized conduction electrons leads to a competition of the Kondo interaction (which favors a non-magnetic ground state) and the RKKY interaction (which generates magnetically ordered states, typically antiferromagnetic for heavy fermions). By suppressing the Néel temperature of a heavy-fermion antiferromagnet down to zero (e.g. by applying pressure or magnetic field or by changing the material composition), a quantum phase transition can be induced. The proximity to a quantum critical point determines many of the properties of these systems and allows a scaling description. The coherence temperature that marks the onset of the Fermi liquid behavior in heavy fermions is distinct from the Kondo temperature in dilute alloys and a direct consequence of these systems being near a quantum critical point. For several heavy-fermion materials it was shown that such a quantum phase transition can generate very pronounced non-Fermi liquid properties at finite temperatures. Such quantum-critical behavior is also studied in great detail in the context of unconventional superconductivity.

Examples of heavy-fermion materials with well-studied quantum-critical properties are CeCu_{6−x}Au, CeIn_{3}, CePd_{2}Si_{2}, YbRh_{2}Si_{2}, and CeCoIn_{5}.

== Some heavy fermion compounds ==
- CeCoIn_{5}
- URu_{2}Si_{2}
- UPd_{2}Al_{3}
- YbBiPt
