= Vesna F. Mitrović =

Serbian-American physicist, academic

- Mitrovic in 2026
- Born: 1973 (age 52–53); Šabac, Serbia (formerly Yugoslavia)
- Education: Illinois Institute of Technology (IIT); Northwestern University
- Awards: Alfred P. Sloan Fellow; Fellow of the American Physical Society; NSF CAREER award
- Scientific career
- Fields: Condensed Matter Physics
- Workplaces: Brown University
- Thesis: Nuclear Magnetic Resonance Study of the Onset of Superconductivity and Low Energy Excitations in High Temperature Superconductors
- Doctoral advisor: William P. Halperin

Vesna F. Mitrović (born 1973) is a Serbian-American physicist, academic, and researcher. She is the L. Herbert Ballou University Professor of Physics and Professor of Engineering at Brown University, where she currently serves as Chair of the Department of Physics. Her work focuses on experimental condensed matter physics, particularly the quantum properties of strongly correlated materials studied using spin resonance techniques under extreme conditions of high magnetic fields and ultra low temperatures.

In recent years, Mitrović’s work has expanded to include the identification and control of fundamental properties of quantum matter, with a specific emphasis on harnessing the data revolution for advances in quantum control and materials science. She has led significant studies on exotic superconducting states, ubiquitous charge correlations in kagome superconductors, and the detection of non-conformist particles such as anyons. An Alfred P. Sloan Fellow (2007) , she was elected a Fellow of the American Physical Society (APS) in 2015 for her "pioneering contributions to NMR study of low energy excitations in emergent quantum phases." She also hold leadership positions within the APS, having been elected as a Member at Large on the APS Council and Executive Committee Vice-Chair of the Group on Instrument and Measurement Science (GIMS). She currently leads the Condensed Matter NMR Group at Brown University.

== Early life and education ==
Mitrović was born in Šabac, Serbia (formerly Yugoslavia) in 1973. She moved to the United States for her university education and earned her undergraduate degree from the Illinois Institute of Technology (IIT) in Chicago and completed her Ph.D. in Physics at Northwestern University in 2001 under the supervision of William P. Halperin.

Following her doctorate, she conducted postdoctoral research at the Grenoble National High Magnetic Field Laboratory in France in the group of Claude Berthier, where she gained experience in high-field, ultra low-temperature experimental techniques.

== Academic career ==
Mitrović joined the faculty of Brown University where she was appointed Assistant Professor in 2004 and named Manning Assistant Professor of Physics in 2007. She was promoted to Associate Professor in 2007 and to Professor of Physics in 2018. In 2022 she was appointed to L. Herbert Ballou University Professor of Physics. From 2024, she was appointed Chair of the Department of Physics.

Mitrović is a Fellow of the American Physical Society (APS) for "pioneering contributions to NMR study of low energy excitations in emergent quantum phases.".

She was an Alfred P. Sloan Foundation Fellow and the recipient of the NSF CAREER award.

She has been appointed to the editorial boards of the New Journal of Physics and the Journal of Low Temperature Physics.

Mitrović's research has been featured Physics.org, ScienceDaily, Materials Today, IOP Physics World and MRS Bulletin.

== Research ==
Mitrović employs spin resonance techniques, particularly nuclear magnetic resonance (NMR), to probe quantum properties of materials. Her work encompasses unconventional superconductors (e.g. identification of the microscopic nature of the FFLO state), strongly correlated systems, spin-orbit entangled materials, quantum magnets, and topological and frustrated quantum systems. In recent years, her research has increasingly intersected with quantum information science (QIS), contributing to the development of quantum probes of matter (e.g. for understanding relativistic Mott insulators) and novel quantum sensing techniques, as well as extending QIS concepts to real materials with many interacting degrees of freedom.

== Selected publications ==
- Mitrović, V. F.; Sigmund, E. E.; Eschrig, M.; Bachman, H. N.; Halperin, W. P.; Reyes, A. P.; Kuhns, P.; Moulton, W. G. (2001-10-04). "Spatially resolved electronic structure inside and outside the vortex cores of a high-temperature superconductor". Nature. 413 (6855): 501–504. arXiv:cond-mat/0108293. doi:10.1038/35097039. ISSN 0028-0836. PMID 11586354.
- Koutroulakis, G.; Stewart, M. D.; Mitrović, V. F.; Horvatić, M.; Berthier, C.; Lapertot, G.; Flouquet, J. (2010-02-23). "Field Evolution of Coexisting Superconducting and Magnetic Orders in CeCoIn 5". Physical Review Letters. 104 (8). arXiv:0912.3548. doi:10.1103/PhysRevLett.104.087001. ISSN 0031-9007.
- Lu, L.; Song, M.; Liu, W.; Reyes, A. P.; Kuhns, P.; Lee, H. O.; Fisher, I. R.; Mitrović, V. F. (2017-02-09). "Magnetism and local symmetry breaking in a Mott insulator with strong spin orbit interactions". Nature Communications. 8 (1). doi:10.1038/ncomms14407. ISSN 2041-1723. PMC 5309813. PMID 28181502.
- Mayaffre, H.; Krämer, S.; Horvatić, M.; Berthier, C.; Miyagawa, K.; Kanoda, K.; Mitrović, V. F. (2014). "Evidence of Andreev bound states as a hallmark of the FFLO phase in κ-(BEDT-TTF)2Cu(NCS)2". Nature Physics. 10 (12): 928–932. arXiv:1409.0786. doi:10.1038/nphys3121. ISSN 1745-2473.
- Wei, Zezhu; Mitrović, V. F.; Feldman, D. E. (2021-10-11). "Thermal Interferometry of Anyons in Spin Liquids". Physical Review Letters. 127 (16). arXiv:2105.06873. doi:10.1103/PhysRevLett.127.167204. ISSN 0031-9007.
- Zhuang, Zekun; Mitrović, V. F.; Marston, J. B. (2021-07-26). "Resistively detected NMR as a probe of the topological nature of conducting edge/surface states". Physical Review B. 104 (4). arXiv:2104.00146. doi:10.1103/PhysRevB.104.045144. ISSN 2469-9950.
- Rao, Anantha; Carr, Stephen; Snider, Charles; Feldman, D. E.; Ramanathan, Chandrasekhar; Mitrović, V. F. (2023-10-30). "Machine-learning-assisted determination of electronic correlations from magnetic resonance". Physical Review Research. 5 (4). arXiv:2212.01946. doi:10.1103/PhysRevResearch.5.043098. ISSN 2643-1564.
- Candoli, Davide; Nikolov, Ilija K.; Brito, Lucas Z.; Carr, Stephen; Sanna, Samuele; Mitrović, Vesna F. (2023). "PULSEE: A software for the quantum simulation of an extensive set of magnetic resonance observables". Computer Physics Communications. 284 108598. arXiv:2108.11415. doi:10.1016/j.cpc.2022.108598. hdl:11585/916710.
