= YRS =

Yrs or YRS may refer to:

== People ==
- Yrsa, a tragic heroine of Scandinavian legend
- Yahya Rahmat-Samii, Iranian engineer

== Other uses ==
- Years
- Year-round school
- Young Rewired State or Rewired State, a series of British hacking events
- Ytterbium dirhodium disilicide (YbRh_{2}Si_{2}), an intermetallic
- Yorkshire Ridings Society
- Young Rebel Set, an English indie rock band
- Red Sucker Lake Airport, Manitoba, Canada (by IATA code YRS)
- Yuen Ren Society, an organization for Chinese dialectology

== See also ==
- YR (disambiguation)
