= UPd2Al3 =

UPd_{2}Al_{3} is a heavy-fermion superconductor with a hexagonal crystal structure and critical temperature T_{c}=2.0K that was discovered in 1991. Furthermore, UPd_{2}Al_{3} orders antiferromagnetically at T_{N}=14K, and UPd_{2}Al_{3} thus features the unusual behavior that this material, at temperatures below 2K, is simultaneously superconducting and magnetically ordered. Later experiments demonstrated that superconductivity in UPd_{2}Al_{3} is magnetically mediated, and UPd_{2}Al_{3} therefore serves as a prime example for non-phonon-mediated superconductors.

== Discovery ==
Heavy-fermion superconductivity was discovered already in the late 1970s (with CeCu_{2}Si_{2} being the first example), but the number of heavy-fermion compounds known to superconduct was still very small in the early 1990s, when Christoph Geibel in the group of Frank Steglich found two closely related heavy-fermion superconductors, UNi_{2}Al_{3} (T_{c}=1K) and UPd_{2}Al_{3} (T_{c}=2K), which were published in 1991. At that point, the T_{c}=2.0K of UPd_{2}Al_{3} was the highest critical temperature amongst all known heavy-fermion superconductors, and this record would stand for 10 years until CeCoIn_{5} was discovered in 2001.

== Metallic state ==
The overall metallic behavior of UPd_{2}Al_{3}, e.g. as deduced from the dc resistivity, is typical for a heavy-fermion material and can be explained as follows: incoherent Kondo scattering above approximately 80 K and coherent heavy-fermion state (in a Kondo lattice) at lower temperatures. Upon cooling below 14 K, UPd_{2}Al_{3} orders antiferromagnetically in a commensurate fashion (ordering wave vector (0,0,1/2)) and with a sizable ordered magnetic moment of approximately 0.85 μ_{B} per uranium atom, as determined from neutron scattering.

The metallic heavy-fermion state is characterized by a strongly enhanced effective mass, which is connected to a reduced Fermi velocity, which in turn brings about a strongly suppressed transport scattering rate. Indeed, for UPd_{2}Al_{3} optical Drude behavior with an extremely low scattering rate was observed at microwave frequencies. This is the 'slowest Drude relaxation' observed for any three-dimensional metallic system so far.

== Superconducting state ==
Superconductivity in UPd_{2}Al_{3} has a critical temperature of 2.0K and a critical field around 3T. The critical field does not show anisotropy despite the hexagonal crystal structure. For heavy-fermion superconductors it is generally believed that the coupling mechanism cannot be phononic in nature. In contrast to many other unconventional superconductors, for UPd_{2}Al_{3} there actually exists strong experimental evidence (namely from neutron scattering and tunneling spectroscopy) that superconductivity is magnetically mediated.

In the first years after the discovery of UPd_{2}Al_{3} it was actively discussed whether its superconducting state can support a Fulde–Ferrell–Larkin–Ovchinnikov (FFLO) phase, but this suggestion was later refuted.
