= Kadowaki–Woods ratio =

Physical parameter

The Kadowaki–Woods ratio is the ratio of A, the quadratic term of the resistivity and γ^{2}, the square of the linear term of the specific heat. This ratio is found to be a constant for transition metals, and for heavy fermion materials, although at different values.

$$R_\mathrm{KW} = \frac{A}{\gamma^2}$$

In 1968 M. J. Rice pointed out that the coefficient A should vary predominantly as the square of the linear electronic specific heat coefficient γ; in particular he showed that the ratio A/γ^{2} is material independent for the pure 3d, 4d and 5d transition metals. Heavy-fermion compounds are characterized by very large values of A and γ. Kadowaki and Woods showed that A/γ^{2} is material-independent within the heavy-fermion compounds, and that it is about 25 times larger than in aforementioned transition metals.

It was shown by K. Miyake, T. Matsuura and C.M. Varma that local Fermi liquids, quasiparticle mass and lifetime are linked consistent with the A/γ^{2} ratio. This suggest that the Kadowaki-Woods ratio reflects a relation between quasiparticle mass and lifetime renormalisation as a function of electron-electron interaction strength.

According to the theory of electron-electron scattering the ratio A/γ^{2} contains indeed several non-universal factors, including the square of the strength of the effective electron-electron interaction. Since in general the interactions differ in nature from one group of materials to another, the same values of A/γ^{2} are only expected within a particular group. In 2005 Hussey proposed a re-scaling of A/γ^{2} to account for unit cell volume, dimensionality, carrier density and multi-band effects. In 2009 Jacko, Fjaerestad, and Powell demonstrated f_{dx}(n)A/γ^{2} to have the same value in transition metals, heavy fermions, organics and oxides with A varying over 10 orders of magnitude, where f_{dx}(n) may be written in terms of the dimensionality of the system, the electron density and, in layered systems, the interlayer spacing or the interlayer hopping integral.

== See also ==
- Wilson ratio
