= Hastatic order =

Hastatic order is a fundamental way of breaking double "time-reversal" symmetry. It is present in the heavy-fermion compound URu_{2}Si_{2}. This order was dubbed hastatic from hasta, the Latin word for "spear". Its cycle is twice as complex as magnetism.

== Discovery ==
Hastatic order was first reported in January 2013 when the heavy-fermion uranium compound URu_{2}Si_{2} was cooled to nearly −415 °F (−248.3 °C). It was said to produce extra heat and the heat was the main mystery. After the extra heat was released, particles were arranged at this way, making the hastatic order present on that reaction.
