= Quantum phases =

Quantum states of matter at zero temperature

Quantum phases are quantum states of matter at zero temperature. Even at zero temperature a quantum-mechanical system has quantum fluctuations and therefore can still support phase transitions. As a physical parameter is varied, quantum fluctuations can drive a phase transition into a different phase of matter. An example of a canonical quantum phase transition is the well-studied Superconductor Insulator Transition in disordered thin films which separates two quantum phases having different symmetries. Quantum magnets provide another example of QPT. The discovery of new quantum phases is a pursuit of many scientists. These phases of matter exhibit properties and symmetries which can potentially be exploited for technological purposes.

The difference between these states and classical states of matter is that classically, materials exhibit different phases which ultimately depends on the change in temperature and/or density or some other macroscopic property of the material whereas quantum phases can change in response to a change in a different type of order parameter (which is instead a parameter in the Hamiltonian of the system, unlike the classical case) of the system at zero temperature – temperature does not have to change. The order parameter plays a role in quantum phases analogous to its role in classical phases. Some quantum phases are the result of a superposition of many other quantum phases.

== See also ==
- Quantum phase transition
- Classical phase transitions
- Quantum critical point
