= Wandtke =

Wandtke is a surname. Notable people with the surname include:

- Hanne Wandtke (born 1930), German contemporary dancer and choreographer
- Igor Wandtke (born 1990), German judoka
- Paul Wandtke (born 1985), American musician, songwriter and producer
