= Alan Harold Luther =

American physicist (born 1940)

- Born: December 14, 1940 (age 85); United States
- Education: Massachusetts Institute of Technology (BS, MS); University of Maryland, College Park (PhD)
- Awards: Oliver E. Buckley Prize (2001)
- Scientific career
- Fields: Condensed matter physics
- Institutions: Nordita

Alan Harold Luther (born December 14, 1940) is an American physicist, specializing in condensed matter physics.

== Education and career ==
Luther graduated in electrical engineering from Massachusetts Institute of Technology (MIT) with a B.S. in 1962 and an M.S. in 1963. In 1967 he graduated from the University of Maryland with a Ph.D. in physics under the supervision of Richard Allan Ferrell. As a postdoc Luther was from 1967 to 1969 at the Technical University of Munich and from 1969 to 1971 at Brookhaven National Laboratory. At Harvard University he was from 1971 to 1973 an assistant professor and from 1973 to 1976 an associate professor. At Nordita in Copenhagen he was from 1976 a full professor from 1976 until his retirement as professor emeritus.

In 1974 he found, with Victor Emery, exact solutions for one-dimensional electron gas models (Luther–Emery liquids). Luther's research also deals with boson-fermion duality, conformal field theories, the generalized Bethe ansatz, spin chains and two-dimensional models of statistical mechanics, strongly correlated electron systems in two dimensions, and high-temperature superconductivity.

For the academic year 1975–1976 he was a Sloan Research Fellow. In 2001 he received (with Victor Emery) the Oliver E. Buckley Condensed Matter Prize for "fundamental contribution to the theory of interacting electrons in one dimension."

== Selected publications ==
- Luther, A.H. (1964). "Planar dielectric–waveguide modes". Proceedings of the IEEE. 52 (11): 1386. doi:10.1109/PROC.1964.3411.
- Luther, Alan H. (1967). "Collective Modes near the Spin‐Flip Continuum and Spin Depolarization due to Indirect Exchange". Journal of Applied Physics. 38 (3): 1061–1063. Bibcode:1967JAP....38.1061L. doi:10.1063/1.1709486.
- Fulde, Peter; Luther, Alan (1968). "Effects of Impurities on Spin Fluctuations in Almost Ferromagnetic Metals". Physical Review. 170 (2): 570–575. Bibcode:1968PhRv..170..570F. doi:10.1103/PhysRev.170.570.
- Cullen, James R.; Callen, Earl; Luther, Alan H. (1968). "Indirect Exchange in Many‐Valley Semiconductors". Journal of Applied Physics. 39 (2): 1105–1106. Bibcode:1968JAP....39.1105C. doi:10.1063/1.1656183.
- Cullen, James R.; Callen, Earl; Luther, Alan H. (1968). "Indirect Exchange in Semiconductors". Physical Review. 170 (3): 733–738. Bibcode:1968PhRv..170..733C. doi:10.1103/PhysRev.170.733.
- Silberglitt, R. S.; Luther, A. H. (1971). "Ondes de spins (1^{re} partie) two magnon bound state due to magnon-phonon coupling". Le Journal de Physique Colloques. 32. doi:10.1051/jphyscol:19711241.
- Klemm, Richard A.; Beasley, M. R.; Luther, A. (1973). "Fluctuation-Induced Diamagnetism in Dirty Three-Dimensional, Two-Dimensional, and Layered Superconductors". Physical Review B. 8 (11): 5072–5081. Bibcode:1973PhRvB...8.5072K. doi:10.1103/PhysRevB.8.5072.
- Emery, V. J.; Luther, A. (1974). "Low- temperature properties of the Kondo Hamiltonian". Physical Review B. 9 (1): 215–226. Bibcode:1974PhRvB...9..215E. doi:10.1103/PhysRevB.9.215.
- Luther, A.; Emery, V. J. (1974). "Backward Scattering in the One-Dimensional Electron Gas". Physical Review Letters. 33 (10): 589–592. Bibcode:1974PhRvL..33..589L. doi:10.1103/PhysRevLett.33.589.
- Klemm, Richard A.; Beasley, M. R.; Luther, A. (1974). "The upper critical field of layered superconductors". Journal of Low Temperature Physics. 16 (5–6): 607–613. Bibcode:1974JLTP...16..607K. doi:10.1007/BF00654905. S2CID 121213010.
- Emery, V. J.; Luther, A.; Peschel, I. (1976). "Solution of the one-dimensional electron gas on a lattice". Physical Review B. 13 (3): 1272–1276. Bibcode:1976PhRvB..13.1272E. doi:10.1103/PhysRevB.13.1272.
- Luther, A. (1976). "Eigenvalue spectrum of interacting massive fermions in one dimension". Physical Review B. 14 (5): 2153–2159. Bibcode:1976PhRvB..14.2153L. doi:10.1103/PhysRevB.14.2153.
- Luther, A. (1977). "Quantum solitons in one-dimensional conductors". Physical Review B. 15 (1): 403–412. Bibcode:1977PhRvB..15..403L. doi:10.1103/PhysRevB.15.403.
- Luther, A. H. (1980). "Quantum Solitons in Statistical Physics". Solitons. Topics in Current Physics. Vol. 17. pp. 355–372. doi:10.1007/978-3-642-81448-8_12. ISBN 978-3-642-81450-1.
- Luther, A.; Schotte, K.D. (1984). "Boson-Fermion duality in four dimensions: Neutrinos from photons and vice versa". Nuclear Physics B. 242 (2): 407–435. Bibcode:1984NuPhB.242..407L. doi:10.1016/0550-3213(84)90402-4.
- Timonen, J.; Luther, A. (1985). "Continuum-limit correlation functions for the spin-one anisotropic Heisenberg chain". Journal of Physics C: Solid State Physics. 18 (7): 1439–1454. Bibcode:1985JPhC...18.1439T. doi:10.1088/0022-3719/18/7/011.
- Nersesyan, A.A.; Luther, A.; Kusmartsev, F.V. (1993). "Scaling properties of the two-chain model". Physics Letters A. 176 (5): 363–370. arXiv:cond-mat/9303041. Bibcode:1993PhLA..176..363N. doi:10.1016/0375-9601(93)90934-R.
- Nersesyan, A. A.; Luther, A. (1994). "Gapless phases in an S=1/2 quantum spin chain with bond alternation". Physical Review B. 50 (1): 309–318. arXiv:cond-mat/9404063. Bibcode:1994PhRvB..50..309N. doi:10.1103/PhysRevB.50.309. PMID 9974544. S2CID 6209552.
- Aristov, D. N.; Luther, A. (2002). "Correlations in the sine-Gordon model with finite soliton density". Physical Review B. 65 (16) 165412. arXiv:cond-mat/0107320. Bibcode:2002PhRvB..65p5412A. doi:10.1103/PhysRevB.65.165412.

=== Books ===
- Luther, A. H., ed. (2013). Advances in Theoretical Physics: Proceedings of the Landau Birthday Symposium, Copenhagen, 13-17 June 1988. Elsevier Science. ISBN 978-1-4832-8695-2.
