= Dicalcium ruthenate =

Calcium Ruthenate
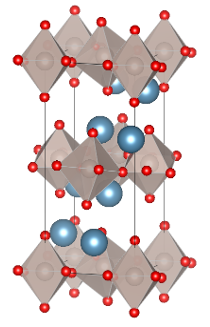

Identifiers
3D model (JSmol)	Interactive image
- InChI: InChI=1S/2Ca.O4Ru/c;;1-5(2,3)4/q2*+2;-4; Key: JWAHTWBBWFKEMH-UHFFFAOYSA-N
- SMILES: [Ca+2].[Ca+2].[O-][Ru]([O-])([O-])[O-]

Properties
Chemical formula	Ca_{2}O_{4}Ru
Molar mass	245.22 g·mol^{−1}

Related compounds
Other cations	Distrontium ruthenate
- Except where otherwise noted, data are given for materials in their standard state (at 25 °C [77 °F], 100 kPa). Infobox references

Dicalcium ruthenate, commonly referred to as calcium ruthenate with the chemical formula Ca_{2}RuO_{4}, is a stoichiometric oxide compound that hosts a multi-orbital (band) Mott insulating ground state as it exhibits strong coupling between lattice, spin and orbital degrees of freedom. For this reason, Ca_{2}RuO_{4} serves as an important "meeting-point" between conceptual developments of strongly correlated multi-band physics and advanced experimental spectroscopies. Its electronic structure and also orbital magnetism are therefore subjects of experimental and theoretical scrutiny. Ca_{2}RuO_{4} belongs to the Ruddlesden–Popper family of layered perovskites (n = 1), consisting of RuO_{6} octahedral sheets separated by rock-salt CaO layers.

== Electronic, structural, and magnetic properties ==
Ca_{2}RuO_{4} undergoes a first-order metal–insulator transition near 357 K that coincides with a structural change from a metallic long-c (L-Pbca) to an insulating short-c (S-Pbca) orthorhombic phase. The transition features an abrupt distortion of the RuO_{6} octahedra, where the in-plane Ru–O bonds lengthen and the apical bond shortens, producing a flattened octahedron with an enhanced tilt. "Pbca" refers to an orthorhombic space group (No. 61).

The crystal structure of Ca_{2}RuO_{4} is a strongly distorted variant of the K_{2}NiF_{4} structure, with substantially larger rotations and tilts of the RuO_{6} octahedra than in Sr_{2}RuO_{4}, driven by the smaller size of the Ca ions. The RuO_{6} octahedra display cooperative tetragonal distortions that transform as the Γ_{1}^{+} irreducible representation of the I4/mmm phase, along with pronounced rotations (Q^{R}, X_{2}^{+}) and tilts (Q^{T}, X_{3}^{+}). Together, these distortions lower the symmetry from the high-symmetry tetragonal I4/mmm structure to the orthorhombic Pbca phase observed at room temperature.

The electronic states near the Fermi level in Ca_{2}RuO_{4} are derived primarily from Ru–O antibonding bands with Ru t_{2}g character (d_{xy}, d_{xz}, d_{yz}), occupied by four electrons per Ru ion. Below approximately 340 K, the material undergoes a first-order transition from a high-temperature metallic phase to a low-temperature insulating phase without a change in crystal symmetry. Instead, the two phases differ in the degree of RuO_{6} octahedral distortion and in the relative occupancies of the Ru t_{2}g orbitals. In the insulating phase, the lower-energy d_{xy} orbital is fully occupied, while the higher-energy d_{xz} and d_{yz} orbitals are each half-filled. In contrast, in the metallic phase the three t_{2}g orbitals have approximately equal occupancies of about 4/3 electrons per orbital.

Negative thermal expansion has also been reported in conjunction with this c-axis compression. The metal-insulator transition is sensitive to electrical current. Ca_{2}RuO_{4} exhibits a current-induced metal-insulator transition in which the application of sufficiently high current densities drives a reversible transition to a low-resistance state, accompanied by hysteretic resistive switching. In epitaxial thin films, this transition is highly stable and tunable, with the threshold current and transition temperature controlled by the applied current amplitude rather than Joule heating.

Ca_{2}RuO_{4} is an ordinary paramagnetic metal above the transition temperature. Below 110-115 K, it develops a long-range anti-ferromagnetic ordering. The magnetic structure has B-centered magnetic order similar to La_{2}NiO_{4}.The easy axis for magnetization is parallel to the a or b axis in the Ru-O plane. Spin direction aligns with the octahedral tilt axis, not with bond elongation, highlighting strong magneto-elastic and spin–orbit coupling.

== Epitaxial thin films ==
Distortions of the RuO_{6} octahedra are a key factor in determining the electronic ground state of Ca_{2}RuO_{4}. In bulk materials, hydrostatic and uniaxial pressure can modify these distortions and induce a transition to a metallic phase with low-temperature ferromagnetism but this would be incompatible with oxide electronics. In thin films, epitaxial strain provides an alternative mechanism for tuning the lattice structure, leading to a change in the electronic and magnetic properties. It has been grown on various substrates using techniques like molecular beam epitaxy and pulsed laser deposition. Ca_{2}RuO_{4} thin films grown on substrates including LaAlO_{3} (100), LaSrAlO_{4} (001), and NdCaAlO_{4} (110) are subject to distinct epitaxial strain states that significantly modify their lattice constants and RuO_{6} octahedral geometry. X-ray diffraction and reciprocal-space mapping indicate that films deposited on LaAlO_{3} and LaSrAlO_{4} remain fully coherent with the substrate, while those grown on NdCaAlO_{4} accommodate strain only partially within the film plane. Despite these differences, all films preserve the orthorhombic Pbca-type structure of bulk Ca_{2}RuO_{4}, exhibiting characteristic rotations and tilts of the RuO_{6} octahedra.

Epitaxial strain strongly influences the transport properties of Ca_{2}RuO_{4} thin films. Under compressive biaxial strain, particularly on LaAlO_{3} and LaSrAlO_{4} substrates, the films display metallic behavior over a wide temperature range, in contrast to the Mott-insulating ground state of bulk Ca_{2}RuO_{4}. Films on [LaAlO_{3} retain a metal–insulator transition near room temperature, though with a reduced resistivity jump and pronounced hysteresis, consistent with partial substrate clamping, while films on LaSrAlO_{4} remain metallic from low temperatures to at least 400 K. In comparison, films grown on NdCaAlO_{4} remain insulating over the full measured temperature range.

Recent work on LaAlO_{3} substrate grown films show the emergence of a periodic nano-texture of the insulating and metallic phases akin to ferroelectric domains below the transition temperature as seen by synchrotron X-ray imaging and confirmed by cryo-TEM.

== Related materials ==
As Sr replaces Ca in Ca_{2-x}Sr_{x}RuO_{4}, the strong RuO_{6} octahedral tilt and flattening are progressively reduced, which suppresses the Mott insulating S-Pbca phase and drives the system metallic. For x ≳ 0.15–0.2 the metal–insulator transition disappears, and long-range antiferromagnetism vanishes. At higher Sr content, only rotational distortions remain (I4_{1}/acd symmetry), producing a correlated metal. Ca_{1.8}Sr_{0.2}RuO_{4} has been proposed as a candidate system for orbital selective Mott physics. The bilayer compound Ca_{3}Ru_{2}O_{7} is metallic, but display a sequence of electronic transitions below 60 K. Finally, Sr_{2}RuO_{4} hosts an unconventional superconducting state.
