= CeCoIn5 =

Heavy-fermion superconductor

CeCoIn_{5} ("Cerium-Cobalt-Indium 5") is a heavy-fermion superconductor with a layered crystal structure, with somewhat two-dimensional electronic transport properties. The critical temperature of 2.3 K is the highest among all of the Ce-based heavy-fermion superconductors.

== Material system ==
CeCoIn_{5} is a member of a rich family of heavy-fermion compounds. CeIn_{3} is heavy-fermion metal with cubic crystal structure that orders antiferromagnetically below 10K. With applying external pressure, antiferromagnetism in CeIn_{3} is continuously suppressed, and a superconducting dome emerges in the phase diagram near the antiferromagnetic quantum critical point. CeCoIn_{5} has a tetragonal crystal structure, and the unit cell of CeCoIn_{5} can be considered as 'CeIn_{3} with an additional CoIn_{2} layer per unit cell'. Closely related to CeCoIn_{5} is the heavy-fermion material CeRhIn_{5}, which has the same crystal structure and which orders antiferromagnetically below 4K, but does not become superconducting at ambient pressure. At high pressure CeRhIn_{5} becomes superconducting with a maximum T_{c} slightly above 2 K at a pressure around 2 GPa, and at the same pressure the Fermi surface of CeRhIn_{5} changes suggesting so-called local quantum criticality. Also the compound PuCoGa_{5}, which is a superconductor with T_{c} approximately 18.5 K and which can be considered an intermediate between heavy-fermion and cuprate superconductors, has the same crystal structure.

Growth of single-crystalline CeCoIn_{5} has been very successful soon after the discovery of the material, and large single crystals of CeCoIn_{5}, such as required for inelastic neutron scattering, have been prepared. (In contrast to some other heavy-fermion compounds where single-crystal growth is more challenging.)

== Superconducting properties ==
The upper critical magnetic field H_{c2} of the superconducting state of CeCoIn_{5} is anisotropic, in accordance with the crystal structure and other physical properties. For magnetic fields applied along the [100] direction, H_{c2} amounts to approximately 11.6 T, and H_{c2} for fields along the [001] directions to 4.95 T.

The superconducting order parameter has d-wave symmetry, as established by several experiments, such as scanning tunneling microscopy (STM) and spectroscopy (STS).

Detailed studies close to the critical field have been performed on CeCoIn_{5}, and indications were found that certain regimes in the phase diagram of this material should be interpreted in terms of the Fulde–Ferrell–Larkin–Ovchinnikov (FFLO) phase. Subsequently, the neutron-diffraction experiments showed that this regime features a more complex phase that also exhibits incommensurate antiferromagnetic order, a so-called 'Q phase'.

Evidence for a delocalization quantum phase transition without symmetry breaking is presented.
