= William Halperin =

William P. Halperin
- Born: July 16, 1945 (age 81); Ottawa
- Occupations: Physicist, academic, and researcher
- Awards: National Research Council Fellowship (Canada); Alfred P. Sloan Fellow; Fellow, American Physical Society; E. LeRoy Hall, Distinguished Teaching Award; Fritz London Memorial Prize

Academic background
- Education: B.Sc. M.Sc. Ph.D.
- Alma mater: Queen's University; University of Toronto; Cornell University

Academic work
- Institutions: Northwestern University

William P. Halperin is a Canadian-American physicist, academic, and researcher. He is the Orrington Lunt Professor of Physics at Northwestern University.

Halperin is an experimentalist in condensed matter physics specializing in ultra-low temperature investigations of quantum liquids and solids, notably liquid and solid ^{3}He (the light isotope of helium), superconducting quantum materials and unconventional superconductivity, magnetic compounds, highly porous materials including aerogels, porous glasses and cements. He has developed specialized acoustic techniques for very low temperatures as well as applications of nuclear magnetic resonance (NMR) for very high magnetic fields.

Halperin is a fellow and life member of the American Physical Society (APS) and life member of the Division of Condensed Matter Physics (DCMP) of the APS. He was elected chair of DCMP in 2017, and was elected to the Administrative Council of the APS for the period 2020–2024. He has served as an Editor for Progress in Low Temperature Physics (volumes 14–16).

== Early life and education ==
Halperin was born in Ottawa on July 16, 1945. He attended the Kingston Collegiate and Vocational Institute in Kingston Ontario and the Lycée Lavoisier in Paris. After receiving his bachelor's degree from Queen's University in 1967 and his master's degree from the University of Toronto in 1968, he moved to the United States, earning his Doctorate in 1975 under the direction of advisor Robert C. Richardson at Cornell University.

== Career ==
Halperin started his career as an assistant professor at Northwestern University in 1975, and was promoted to associate professor in 1981, and to professor in 1986. From 1979 till 1985, he served as resident associate at Argonne National Laboratory. He also held a brief appointment in 1984 at the Centre National de Recherche Scientifique as Chercheur Associé in Grenoble, France.

Halperin was appointed as chair of the Department of Physics and Astronomy from 1991 till 1996, and Director of the Integrated Science Program at Northwestern University from 1998 to 2003.

== Research ==
Halperin's research is focused on condensed matter physics, with a particular attention to ultra-low temperature investigations of quantum liquids and solids, notably liquid and solid ^{3}He (the light isotope of helium), unconventional superconductivity, magnetic compounds, highly porous materials including aerogels, porous glasses and cements. His acoustic and nuclear magnetic resonance discoveries include transverse sound and order parameter collective modes in superfluid ^{3}He, quantum size effects in nano-particles, and for solid ^{3}He, the first observation of nuclear magnetic order.

Halperin constructed a Pomeranchuk refrigerator, and with this device in 1974 he reached the lowest temperature achieved at that time in liquid ^{3}He, at a temperature of 0.0007 K. He invented a thermodynamic temperature scale leading to his discovery of antiferromagnetism in solid ^{3}He. This was the first observation of magnetic order in a nuclear system. Otherwise magnetic order was only known to exist among electrons.

Halperin has studied magnetic and acoustic properties of the superfluid phases of ^{3}He, an unconventional, topological superfluid of helium atom pairs at low temperatures below 0.0025 K, discovered by Osheroff, Richardson, and Lee and confirmed by Halperin and coworkers. There are two superfluid phases in zero magnetic field A and B phases. The A phase is a chiral phase that breaks time reversal symmetry. The B phase breaks relative spin-orbit symmetry and is isotropic. The NMR frequency shifts in the A phase were accounted for by Leggett within a framework of the theory of electron superconductivity by Bardeen, Cooper, and Schrieffer (1957).

According to an accepted point of view at the time, the direction of polarization of sound waves in liquids must be aligned with their direction of propagation, so-called longitudinal sound. However, Halperin and coworkers, notably with his student Yoonseok Lee, discovered that sound with transverse polarization propagates robustly in superfluid ^{3}He, rather similar to the well-known propagation of electromagnetic waves of light. This was the first demonstration of propagating transverse sound waves in any liquid. They also discovered that these transverse sound waves in ^{3}He exhibit Faraday rotation of their polarization in the presence of a magnetic field. The analogous behavior for light waves was discovered by Michael Faraday in 1845. These observations, replicated in superfluid helium, are in close agreement with theoretical predictions by Moores and Sauls. The phenomenon is closely related to an as yet experimentally unconfirmed prediction by Landau (1957) that transverse sound waves might propagate in normal liquid ^{3}He in its degenerate Fermi liquid state at temperatures above those of its superfluid phases. Superconductivity in some quantum materials, such as the compound UPt_{3}, is thought to be closely related to superfluidity in ^{3}He, exhibiting chiral symmetry and breaking time reversal symmetry.

A new area of research in quantum fluids opened with the discovery of impurity phases of superfluid ^{3}He by Parpia and by Halperin described theoretically by Sauls. These are superfluid phases of liquid ^{3}He imbibed in highly porous silica aerogel. It was found that the stability of A and B superfluids could be engineered with anisotropy introduced with strain in the aerogel, positive strain favoring stabilization of the chiral A-phase and negative strain stabilizing the isotropic B-phase.

== Awards and honors ==
- 1967 - Prince of Wales Prize (best academic record), Queen's University
- 1967 - National Research Council Fellowship (Canada)
- 1977 - Alfred P. Sloan Fellow
- 1995 - Fellow, American Physical Society
- 2000-2001 - Wender-Lewis Professor of Teaching and Research
- 2001-2016 - John Evans Professor of Physics
- 2007-2008 - E. LeRoy Hall Award, Distinguished Teaching Award
- 2016 - Orrington Lunt Professor of Physics
- 2017 - Fritz London Memorial Prize

== Bibliography ==
- Buhrman, R. A., & Halperin, W. P. (1973). Fluctuation Diamagnetism in a" Zero-Dimensional" Superconductor. Physical Review Letters, 30(15), 692.
- Halperin, W. P., Archie, C. N., Rasmussen, F. B., Buhrman, R. A., & Richardson, R. C. (1974). Observation of Nuclear Magnetic Order in Solid He^{3}. Physical Review Letters, 32(17), 927.
- Halperin, W. P. (1986). Quantum size effects in metal particles. Reviews of Modern Physics, 58, 533.
- D'Orazio, F., Bhattacharja, S., Halperin, W. P., Eguchi, K., & Mizusaki, T. (1990). Molecular diffusion and nuclear-magnetic-resonance relaxation of water in unsaturated porous silica glass. Physical Review B, 42, 9810.
- Halperin, W. P., Jehng, J. Y., & Song, Y. Q. (1994). Application of spin-spin relaxation to measurement of surface area and pore size distributions in a hydrating cement paste. Magnetic resonance imaging, 12, 169–173.
- Sprague, D. T., Haard, T. M., Kycia, J. B., Rand, M. R., Lee, Y., Hamot, P. J., & Halperin, W. P. (1995). Homogeneous equal-spin pairing superfluid state of ^{3}He in aerogel. Physical Review Letters, 75, 661.
- Lee, Y., Haard, T. M., Halperin, W. P., & Sauls, J. A. (1999). Discovery of the acoustic Faraday effect in superfluid ^{3}He-B. Nature, 400(6743), 431–433.
- Mitrović, V. F., Sigmund, E. E., Eschrig, M., Bachman, H. N., Halperin, W. P., Reyes, A. P., Kuhns, P., & Moulton, W. G. (2001). Spatially resolved electronic structure inside and outside the vortex cores of a high-temperature superconductor. Nature, 413, 501–504.
- Choi, H., Davis, J. P., Pollanen, J., & Halperin, W. P. (2006). Surface Specific Heat of He 3 and Andreev Bound States. Physical Review Letters, 96(12), 125301.
- Pollanen, J., Li, J. I. A., Collett, C. A., Gannon, W. J., Halperin, W. P., & Sauls, J. A. (2012). New chiral phases of superfluid ^{3}He stabilized by anisotropic silica aerogel. Nature Physics, 8(4), 317–320.
- Schemm, E. R., Gannon, W. J., Wishne, C. M., Halperin, W. P., & Kapitulnik, A. (2014). Observation of broken time-reversal symmetry in the heavy-fermion superconductor UPt_{3}. Science, 345(6193), 190–193.
- Nguyen, M. D., Zimmerman, A. M., & Halperin, W. P. (2019). Corrections to Higgs mode masses in superfluid He^{3} from acoustic spectroscopy. Physical Review B, 99(5), 054510.
- Halperin, W. P. (2019). Superfluid 3He in aerogel. Annual Review of Condensed Matter Physics, 10, 155–170.
- Avers, K. E., Gannon, W. J., Kuhn, S. J., Halperin, W. P., Sauls, J. A., DeBeer-Schmitt, L., ... & Eskildsen, M. R. (2020). Broken time-reversal symmetry in the topological superconductor UPt_{3}. Nature Physics, 16(5), 531–535.
