= Ytterbium dirhodium disilicide =

Identifiers
CAS Number	264911-31-1
3D model (JSmol)	Interactive image
- InChI: InChI=1S/2Rh.2H4Si.Yb/h;;2*1H4; Key: XJFAFINATNOTHP-UHFFFAOYSA-N
- SMILES: [Yb].[Rh].[Rh].[Si].[Si]

Properties
Chemical formula	Rh_{2}Si_{2}Yb
Molar mass	435.026 g·mol^{−1}
- Except where otherwise noted, data are given for materials in their standard state (at 25 °C [77 °F], 100 kPa). Infobox references

Ytterbium dirhodium disilicide (YbRh_{2}Si_{2}), also abbreviated YRS, is a heavy fermion solid state compound of ytterbium, rhodium and silicon. It becomes superconducting when cooled to 2 mK. Just above this temperature the heat capacity is extremely high, and the electrons behave as if they were 1,000,000 times heavier than they really are.

== See also ==
- Quantum critical point
- Quantum entanglement
