= Richard Allan Ferrell =

American theoretical physicist (1926–2005)

- Born: April 28, 1926; Santa Ana, California
- Died: November 14, 2005 (aged 79); University Park, Maryland
- Education: California Institute of Technology; Princeton University
- Known for: Fulde-Ferrell-Larkin-Ovchinnikov (FFLO) phase
- Scientific career
- Fields: Physics
- Workplaces: University of Maryland
- Thesis: The Fine Structure of Positronium (1952)
- Doctoral advisor: Arthur Wightman
- Doctoral students: Peter Fulde; Alan Harold Luther; John J. Quinn

Richard Allan Ferrell (1926–2005) was an American theoretical physicist, specializing in condensed matter physics and statistical physics.

== Biography ==
Richard A. Ferrell grew up in Orange County, California. During WW II he served in the U. S. Navy. His mother, Elsie Hopper Ferrell (1906–1995), graduated in 1949 with an M.D. from the University of California, Los Angeles School of Medicine. He graduated from the California Institute of Technology with a B.S. in 1948 and an M.S. in 1949. He matriculated in 1949 at Princeton University as a graduate student with fellowship granted by the Atomic Energy Commission and in 1951 won the $1000 top prize in an essay contest sponsored by the Gravity Research Foundation. He married Miriam Laura Conover in 1951. In 1952 he received his Ph.D. from Princeton University. As a postdoc he spent the academic year 1952–1953 under the supervision of Werner Heisenberg at the Max Planck Institute for Physics (which at that time was located in Göttingen). At the invitation of John S. Toll, Ferrell joined in 1953 the faculty of the University of Maryland, where he was promoted to full professor in 1959 and retired as professor emeritus in 1993. He was the author or co-author of more than 150 scientific articles and could write in French, German, and Russian. His 1960 article Electron-nucleus hyperfine interactions in atoms was mentioned in Robert H. Romer's list of memorable papers published in the American Journal of Physics from the years 1933 to 1990. His sabbatical leaves included visiting positions at the CERN laboratory in Geneva and the Max Planck Institutes in Munich and Stuttgart.

In May 1976 Ferrell with several American colleagues attended a Soviet-American physics symposium and also attended the Sunday Seminar of Mark Azbel and other refuseniks. After returning to the United States, Ferrell and his colleagues published a letter of support for the refuseniks.

He not only planted trees in University Park, Maryland, but also helped to persuade officials to have trees planted along U.S. Route 1 in College Park, Maryland and on the campus of the University of Maryland. Upon his death he was survived by his widow, a daughter, a son, and three grandchildren.

In 2001 the University of Maryland established the Richard A. Ferrell Distinguished Faculty Fellowship.

== Ferrell–Glover–Tinkham sum rule ==
The Ferrell–Glover–Tinkham sum rule "asserts that the finite frequency response which is lost in the superconducting transition reappears at the zero frequency 'superconductivity' delta-function." The sum rule is important for many high-T_{c} superconductivity analyses.

As postdocs in 1956, Michael Tinkham and Rolf Eldridge Glover III demonstrated "the existence of a superconducting "energy gap" by showing that light below a certain frequency was transmitted much more readily through a superconducting film than through a normal metal film. This counter-intuitive result was a landmark confirmation of the famous Bardeen-Cooper-Schrieffer theory of superconductivity." Subsequently, Glover and Tinkham collaborated with Ferrell on the theory of their discovery.

== Selected publications ==
- Ferrell, Richard A. (1956). "Theory of Positron Annihilation in Solids". Reviews of Modern Physics. 28 (3): 308–337. Bibcode:1956RvMP...28..308F. doi:10.1103/RevModPhys.28.308. (over 500 citations)
- Ferrell, Richard A. (1956). "Angular Dependence of the Characteristic Energy Loss of Electrons Passing Through Metal Foils". Physical Review. 101 (2): 554–563. Bibcode:1956PhRv..101..554F. doi:10.1103/PhysRev.101.554.
- Ferrell, Richard A. (1957). "Long Lifetime of Positronium in Liquid Helium". Physical Review. 108 (2): 167–168. Bibcode:1957PhRv..108..167F. doi:10.1103/PhysRev.108.167.
- Ferrell, Richard A. (1957). "Characteristic Energy Loss of Electrons Passing through Metal Foils. II. Dispersion Relation and Short Wavelength Cutoff for Plasma Oscillations". Physical Review. 107 (2): 450–462. Bibcode:1957PhRv..107..450F. doi:10.1103/PhysRev.107.450.
- Quinn, John J.; Ferrell, Richard A. (1958). "Electron Self-Energy Approach to Correlation in a Degenerate Electron Gas". Physical Review. 112 (3): 812–827. Bibcode:1958PhRv..112..812Q. doi:10.1103/PhysRev.112.812. (over 500 citations)
- Ferrell, Richard A. (1958). "Predicted Radiation of Plasma Oscillations in Metal Films". Physical Review. 111 (5): 1214–1222. Bibcode:1958PhRv..111.1214F. doi:10.1103/PhysRev.111.1214. (over 450 citations)
- Ferrell, Richard A. (1958). "Ortho-Parapositronium Quenching by Paramagnetic Molecules and Ions". Physical Review. 110 (6): 1355–1357. Bibcode:1958PhRv..110.1355F. doi:10.1103/PhysRev.110.1355.
- Stern, E. A.; Ferrell, R. A. (1960). "Surface Plasma Oscillations of a Degenerate Electron Gas". Physical Review. 120 (1): 130–136. Bibcode:1960PhRv..120..130S. doi:10.1103/PhysRev.120.130. (over 850 citations)
- Ferrell, R. A. (1960). "Electron-Nucleus Hyperfine Interaction in Atoms". American Journal of Physics. 28 (5): 484–486. Bibcode:1960AmJPh..28..484F. doi:10.1119/1.1935840.
- Ferrell, Richard A.; Stern, Edward A. (1962). "Plasma Resonance in the Electrodynamics of Metal Films". American Journal of Physics. 30 (11): 810–812. Bibcode:1962AmJPh..30..810F. doi:10.1119/1.1941812.
- Fulde, Peter; Ferrell, Richard A. (1964). "Superconductivity in a Strong Spin-Exchange Field". Physical Review. 135 (3A): A550–A563. Bibcode:1964PhRv..135..550F. doi:10.1103/PhysRev.135.A550. OSTI 5017462. (over 3750 citations)
- Ferrell, R. A.; Menyhárd, N.; Schmidt, H.; Schwabl, F.; Szépfalusy, P. (1967). "Dispersion in Second Sound and Anomalous Heat Conduction at the Lambda Point of Liquid Helium". Physical Review Letters. 18 (21): 891–894. Bibcode:1967PhRvL..18..891F. doi:10.1103/PhysRevLett.18.891. 1967
- Ferrell, R.A.; Menyhàrd, N.; Schmidt, H.; Schwabl, F.; Szépfalusy, P. (1968). "Fluctuations and lambda phase transition in liquid helium". Annals of Physics. 47 (3): 565–613. Bibcode:1968AnPhy..47..565F. doi:10.1016/0003-4916(68)90214-5.
- Ferrell, Richard A. (1970). "Decoupled-Mode Dynamical Scaling Theory of the Binary-Liquid Phase Transition". Physical Review Letters. 24 (21): 1169–1172. Bibcode:1970PhRvL..24.1169F. doi:10.1103/PhysRevLett.24.1169.
- Scalapino, D. J.; Sears, M.; Ferrell, R. A. (1972). "Statistical Mechanics of One-Dimensional Ginzburg-Landau Fields". Physical Review B. 6 (9): 3409–3416. Bibcode:1972PhRvB...6.3409S. doi:10.1103/PhysRevB.6.3409. (over 550 citations)
- Ferrell, Richard A. (1973). "Gauge Invariant Vacuum Polarization". American Journal of Physics. 41 (1): 111–113. Bibcode:1973AmJPh..41..111F. doi:10.1119/1.1987130.
- Bhattacharjee, J. K.; Ferrell, R. A.; Basu, R. S.; Sengers, J. V. (1981). "Crossover function for the critical viscosity of a classical fluid". Physical Review A. 24 (3): 1469–1475. Bibcode:1981PhRvA..24.1469B. doi:10.1103/PhysRevA.24.1469.
- Burstyn, H. C.; Sengers, J. V.; Bhattacharjee, J. K.; Ferrell, R. A. (1983). "Dynamic scaling function for critical fluctuations in classical fluids". Physical Review A. 28 (3): 1567–1578. Bibcode:1983PhRvA..28.1567B. doi:10.1103/PhysRevA.28.1567.
- Lynn, Jeffrey W., ed. (1990). "Chapter 3. The Josephson Effect by Richard A. Ferrell". High Temperature Superconductivity. Springer. pp. 60–83. ISBN 978-0-387-96770-7.
- Onuki, Akira; Hao, Hong; Ferrell, Richard A. (1990). "Fast adiabatic equilibration in a single-component fluid near the liquid-vapor critical point". Physical Review A. 41 (4): 2256–2259. Bibcode:1990PhRvA..41.2256O. doi:10.1103/PhysRevA.41.2256. PMID 9903349.
- Onuki, Akira; Ferrell, Richard A. (1990). "Adiabatic heating effect near the gas-liquid critical point". Physica A: Statistical Mechanics and Its Applications. 164 (2): 245–264. Bibcode:1990PhyA..164..245O. doi:10.1016/0378-4371(90)90198-2.
