= Order of Merit of the Free State of Saxony =

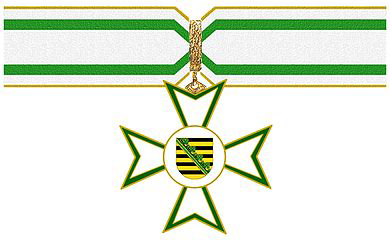
- Insignia of the Order of Merit of the Free State of Saxony
- Type: Order of merit
- Awarded for: Outstanding contributions to the Free State of Saxony and its people
- Country: Germany
- Presented by: the Free State of Saxony
- First award: 27 October 1997

Highlights
- Total: 349
- Ribbon bar of the order

Precedence
- Next (lower): Sächsische Verfassungsmedaille

The Order of Merit of the Free State of Saxony (German: Sächsischer Verdienstorden) is a civil order of merit, and the highest award of the German state of Saxony. First presented in 1997, it is awarded by the Minister-President of Saxony. The order is presented to individuals who have made outstanding contributions to the people and state of Saxony. The award is limited to a total of 500 living recipients. As of October 2020, it has been awarded 349 times.

== Recipients ==
- Kurt Biedenkopf
- Prince Edward, Duke of Kent
- Peter Fulde
- Václav Klaus
- Felix Kolmer
- Reiner Kunze
- Adolf Merckle
- Georg Milbradt
- Karel Schwarzenberg
- Erwin Teufel
- Stanislaw Tillich
- Hanne Wandtke
- Udo Zimmermann
