= Unconventional superconductor =

Superconductive materials not explained by existing established theories

Unconventional superconductors are materials that display superconductivity which is not explained by the usual BCS theory or its extension, the Eliashberg theory. The pairing in unconventional superconductors may originate from some other mechanism than the electron–phonon interaction. Alternatively, a superconductor is unconventional if the superconducting order parameter transforms according to a non-trivial irreducible representation of the point group or space group of the system. Per definition, superconductors that break additional symmetries to U (1) symmetry are known as unconventional superconductors.

== History ==
The superconducting properties of CeCu_{2}Si_{2}, a type of heavy fermion material, were reported in 1979 by Frank Steglich. For a long time it was believed that CeCu_{2}Si_{2} was a singlet d-wave superconductor, but since the mid-2010s, this notion has been strongly contested. In the early eighties, many more unconventional, heavy fermion superconductors were discovered, including UBe_{13}, UPt_{3} and URu_{2}Si_{2}. In each of these materials, the anisotropic nature of the pairing was implicated by the power-law dependence of the nuclear magnetic resonance (NMR) relaxation rate and specific heat capacity on temperature. The presence of nodes in the superconducting gap of UPt_{3} was confirmed in 1986 from the polarization dependence of the ultrasound attenuation.

The first unconventional triplet superconductor, organic material (TMTSF)_{2}PF_{6}, was discovered by Denis Jerome, Klaus Bechgaard and coworkers in 1980 (TMTSF = Tetramethyltetraselenafulvalenium, see Fulvalene). Experimental works by Paul Chaikin's and Michael Naughton's groups as well as theoretical analysis of their data by Andrei Lebed have firmly confirmed unconventional nature of superconducting pairing in (TMTSF)_{2}X (X=PF_{6}, ClO_{4}, etc.) organic materials.

High-temperature singlet d-wave superconductivity was discovered by J.G. Bednorz and K.A. Müller in 1986, who also discovered that the lanthanum-based cuprate perovskite material LaBaCuO_{4} develops superconductivity at a critical temperature (T_{c}) of approximately 35 K (-238 degrees Celsius). This was well above the highest critical temperature known at the time (T_{c} = 23 K), and thus the new family of materials was called high-temperature superconductors. Bednorz and Müller received the Nobel Prize in Physics for this discovery in 1987. Since then, many other high-temperature superconductors have been synthesized.

LSCO (La_{2−x}Sr_{x}CuO_{4}) was discovered the same year (1986). Soon after, in January 1987, yttrium barium copper oxide (YBCO) was discovered to have a T_{c} of 90 K, the first material to achieve superconductivity above the boiling point of liquid nitrogen (77 K). This was highly significant from the point of view of the technological applications of superconductivity because liquid nitrogen is far less expensive than liquid helium, which is required to cool conventional superconductors down to their critical temperature. In 1988 bismuth strontium calcium copper oxide (BSCCO) with T_{c} up to 107 K, and thallium barium calcium copper oxide (TBCCO) (T=thallium) with T_{c} of 125 K were discovered. The current record critical temperature is about T_{c} = 133 K (−140 °C) at standard pressure, and somewhat higher critical temperatures can be achieved at high pressure. Nevertheless, at present it is considered unlikely that cuprate perovskite materials will achieve room-temperature superconductivity.

On the other hand, other unconventional superconductors have been discovered. These include some that do not superconduct at high temperatures, such as strontium ruthenate Sr_{2}RuO_{4}, but that, like high-temperature superconductors, are unconventional in other ways. (For example, the origin of the attractive force leading to the formation of Cooper pairs may be different from the one postulated in BCS theory.) In addition to this, superconductors that have unusually high values of T_{c} but that are not cuprate perovskites have been discovered. Some of them may be extreme examples of conventional superconductors (this is suspected of magnesium diboride, MgB_{2}, with T_{c} = 39 K). Others could display more unconventional features.

In 2008 a new class that does not include copper (layered oxypnictide superconductors), for example LaOFeAs, was discovered. An oxypnictide of samarium seemed to have a T_{c} of about 43 K, which was higher than predicted by BCS theory. Tests at up to 45 T suggested the upper critical field of LaFeAsO_{0.89}F_{0.11} to be around 64 T. Some other iron-based superconductors do not contain oxygen.

As of 2009, the highest-temperature superconductor (at ambient pressure) is mercury barium calcium copper oxide (HgBa_{2}Ca_{2}Cu_{3}O_{x}), at 138 K and is held by a cuprate-perovskite material, possibly 164 K under high pressure.

Other unconventional superconductors not based on cuprate structure have too been found. Some have unusually high values of the critical temperature, T_{c}, and hence they are sometimes also called high-temperature superconductors.

=== Graphene ===
In 2017, scanning tunneling microscopy and spectroscopy experiments on graphene proximitized to the electron-doped (non-chiral) d-wave superconductor Pr_{2−x}Ce_{x}CuO_{4} (PCCO) revealed evidence for an unconventional superconducting density of states induced in graphene. Publications in March 2018 provided evidence for unconventional superconducting properties of a graphene bilayer where one layer was offset by a "magic angle" of 1.1° relative to the other.

== Ongoing research ==
While the mechanism responsible for conventional superconductivity is well described by the BCS theory, the mechanism for unconventional superconductivity is still unknown. After more than twenty years of intense research, the origin of high-temperature superconductivity is still not clear, being one of the major unsolved problems of theoretical condensed matter physics. It appears that unlike conventional superconductivity driven by electron-phonon attraction, genuine electronic mechanisms (such as antiferromagnetic correlations) are at play. Moreover, d-wave pairing, rather than s-wave, is significant.

One goal of much research is room-temperature superconductivity.

Despite intensive research and many promising leads, an explanation has so far eluded scientists. One reason for this is that the materials in question are generally very complex, multi-layered crystals (for example, BSCCO), making theoretical modeling difficult.

== Possible mechanisms ==
The most controversial topic in condensed matter physics has been the mechanism for high-T_{c} superconductivity (HTS). There have been two representative theories on the HTS : (See also Resonating valence bond theory )

=== Weak-coupling theory ===
Firstly, it has been suggested that the HTS emerges by antiferromagnetic spin fluctuation in a doped system. According to this weak-coupling theory, the pairing wave function of the HTS should have a d_{x^{2}−y^{2}} symmetry. Thus, whether the symmetry of the pairing wave function is the d symmetry or not is essential to demonstrate on the mechanism of the HTS in respect of the spin fluctuation. That is, if the HTS order parameter (pairing wave function) does not have d symmetry, then a pairing mechanism related to spin fluctuation can be ruled out. The tunnel experiment (see below) seems to detect d symmetry in some HTS.

=== Interlayer coupling model ===
Secondly, there is the interlayer coupling model, according to which a layered structure consisting of BCS-type (s symmetry) superconductor can enhance the superconductivity by itself. By introducing an additional tunneling interaction between each layer, this model successfully explained the anisotropic symmetry of the order parameter in the HTS as well as the emergence of the HTS.

=== Superexchange ===
Promising experimental results from various researchers in September 2022, including Weijiong Chen, J.C. Séamus Davis and H. Eisiaki revealed that superexchange of electrons is possibly the most probable reason for high-temperature superconductivity.

== Previous studies on the symmetry of the HTS order parameter ==
The symmetry of the HTS order parameter has been studied in nuclear magnetic resonance measurements and, more recently, by angle-resolved photoemission and measurements of the microwave penetration depth in a HTS crystal. NMR measurements probe the local magnetic field around an atom and hence reflect the susceptibility of the material. They have been of special interest for the HTS materials because many researchers have wondered whether spin correlations might play a role in the mechanism of the HTS.

NMR measurements of the resonance frequency on YBCO indicated that electrons in the copper oxide superconductors are paired in spin-singlet states. This indication came from the behavior of the Knight shift, the frequency shift that occurs when the internal field is different from the applied field: In a normal metal, the magnetic moments of the conduction electrons in the neighborhood of the ion being probed align with the applied field and create a larger internal field. As these metals go superconducting, electrons with oppositely directed spins couple to form singlet states. In the anisotropic HTS, perhaps NMR measurements have found that the relaxation rate for copper depends on the direction of the applied static magnetic field, with the rate being higher when the static field is parallel to one of the axes in the copper oxide plane. While this observation by some group supported the d symmetry of the HTS, other groups could not observe it.

Also, by measuring the penetration depth, the symmetry of the HTS order parameter can be studied. The microwave penetration depth is determined by the superfluid density responsible for screening the external field. In the s wave BCS theory, because pairs can be thermally excited across the gap Δ, the change in superfluid density per unit change in temperature goes as exponential behavior, exp(-Δ/k_{B}T). In that case, the penetration depth also varies exponentially with temperature T. If there are nodes in the energy gap as in the d symmetry HTS, electron pair can more easily be broken, the superfluid density should have a stronger temperature dependence, and the penetration depth is expected to increase as a power of T at low temperatures. If the symmetry is specially d_{x^{2}-y^{2}} then the penetration depth should vary linearly with T at low temperatures. This technique is increasingly being used to study superconductors and is limited in application largely by the quality of available single crystals.

Photoemission spectroscopy also could provide information on the HTS symmetry. By scattering photons off electrons in the crystal, one can sample the energy spectra of the electrons. Because the technique is sensitive to the angle of the emitted electrons one can determine the spectrum for different wave vectors on the Fermi surface. However, within the resolution of the angle-resolved photoemission spectroscopy (ARPES), researchers could not tell whether the gap goes to zero or just gets very small. Also, ARPES are sensitive only to the magnitude and not to the sign of the gap, so it could not tell if the gap goes negative at some point. This means that ARPES cannot determine whether the HTS order parameter has the d symmetry or not.

== Junction experiment supporting the d-wave symmetry ==
There was a clever experimental design to overcome the muddy situation. An experiment based on pair tunneling and flux quantization in a three-grain ring of YBa_{2}Cu_{3}O_{7} (YBCO) was designed to test the symmetry of the order parameter in YBCO. Such a ring consists of three YBCO crystals with specific orientations consistent with the d-wave pairing symmetry to give rise to a spontaneously generated half-integer quantum vortex at the tricrystal meeting point. Furthermore, the possibility that junction interfaces can be in the clean limit (no defects) or with maximum zig-zag disorder was taken into account in this tricrystal experiment. A proposal of studying vortices with half magnetic flux quanta in heavy-fermion superconductors in three polycrystalline configurations was reported in 1987 by V. B. Geshkenbein, A. Larkin and A. Barone in 1987.

In the first tricrystal pairing symmetry experiment, the spontaneous magnetization of half flux quantum was clearly observed in YBCO, which convincingly supported the d-wave symmetry of the order parameter in YBCO. Because YBCO is orthorhombic, it might inherently have an admixture of s-wave symmetry. So, by tuning their technique further, it was found that there was an admixture of s-wave symmetry in YBCO within about 3%. Also, it was demonstrated by Tsuei, Kirtley et al. that there was a pure d_{x^{2}-y^{2}} order parameter symmetry in the tetragonal Tl_{2}Ba_{2}CuO_{6}.
