= Yr =

YR, Yr or yr may refer to:

== Characters ==
- Yr (Younger Futhark), ᛦ (transliterated Ʀ), a rune of the Younger Futhark
- Ur (rune), ᚣ (transliterated y), used in Anglo-Saxon manuscript tradition
- Yr (digraph), two characters used as a unit in mainland China's official Pinyin romanization system to write the single vowel /r̝/ in certain languages

== Abbreviations ==
YR, Yr or yr, with or without punctuation, may be abbreviations for:

=== yr ===
- Year

=== Yr. ===
- Younger (title)

=== YR ===
- Yves Rocher (company), French cosmetics brand
- Command & Conquer: Yuri's Revenge, a module for the game Red Alert 2
- Yorkshire Rider, a former British bus operator
- YR, the aircraft registration prefix for Romania

== Other uses ==
- yr.no, a Norwegian weather-related site
- Yr (album), by Steve Tibbetts
- Ýr, a female given name used in Faroese and Icelandic
- A US Navy hull classification symbol: Floating workshop (YR)

== See also ==
- Y&R (disambiguation)
