= James Sauls =

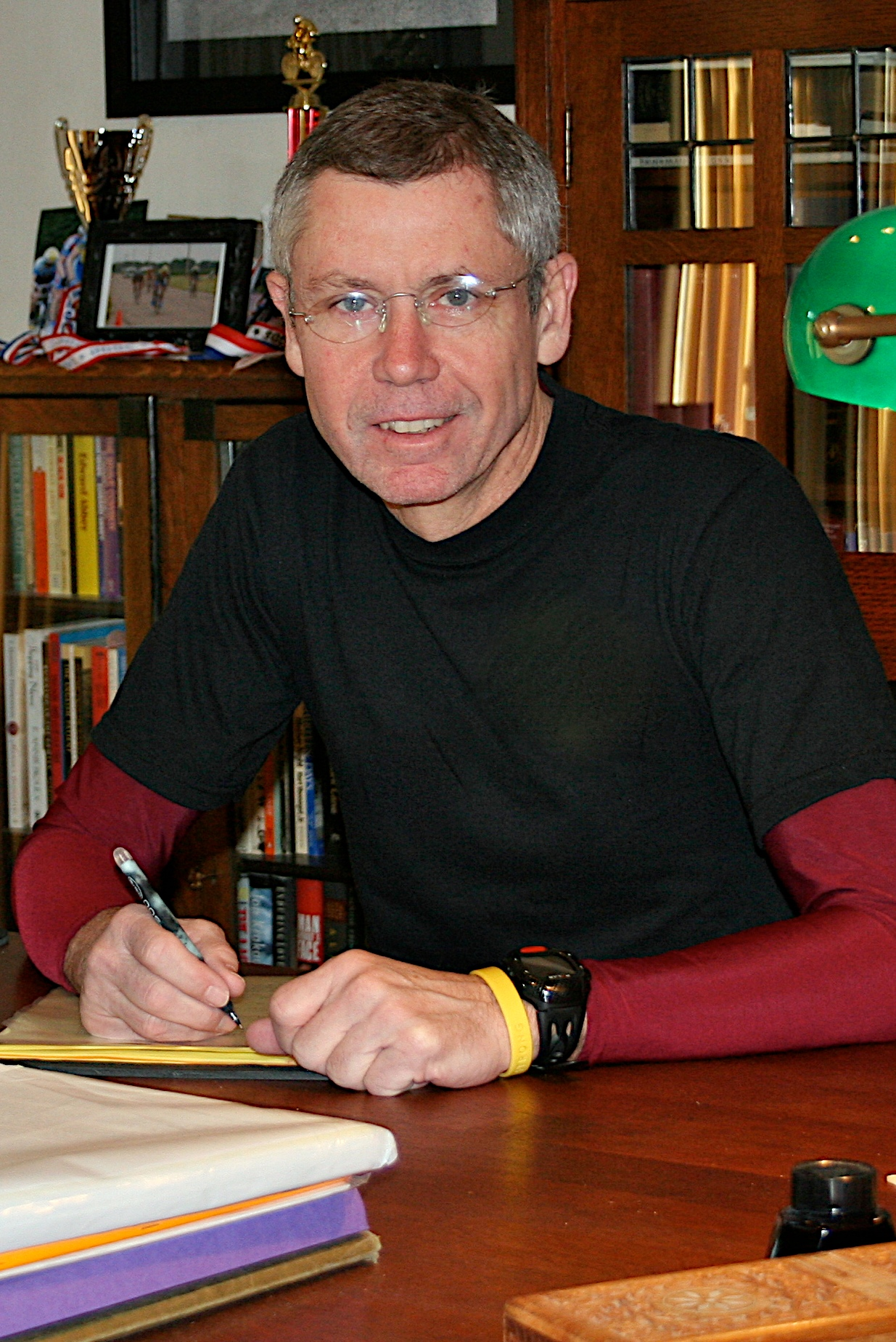
James Avery Sauls

James Avery Sauls is an American physicist.

Sauls studied physics at the Colorado School of Mines, graduating in 1975, and pursued a doctorate in the subject at Stony Brook University, which he completed in 1980. Sauls began his academic career at Princeton University, as research associate, instructor, then assistant professor of physics. In 1987, Sauls joined the faculty of Northwestern University as associate professor. He became a full professor in 1991. In 2021, Sauls was appointed the Sarah Rebecca Roland Professor of Physics.

In 1998, Sauls was elected a fellow of the American Physical Society, "[f]or contributions to theories of unconventional superfluidity and superconductivity." He shared the 2012 John Bardeen Prize with Chandra M. Varma and Steven Kivelson. In 2017, Sauls was jointly awarded the Fritz London Memorial Prize, sharing the honor with William Halperin and Jeevak Parpia.
