= Uranium ruthenium silicide =

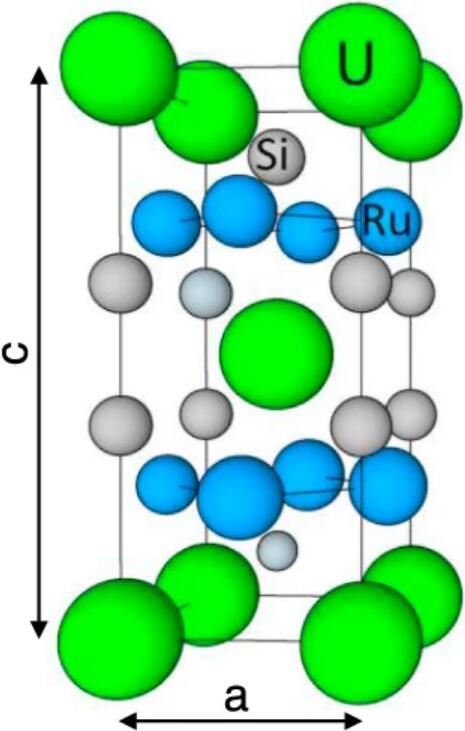

Identifiers
CAS Number	87588-60-1
3D model (JSmol)	Interactive image
- InChI: InChI=1S/2Ru.2Si.U Key: NSFTZNXXKZDCRK-UHFFFAOYSA-N
- SMILES: [Ru].[Ru].[Si].[Si].[U]

Properties
Chemical formula	Ru_{2}Si_{2}U
Molar mass	496.34 g·mol^{−1}
- Except where otherwise noted, data are given for materials in their standard state (at 25 °C [77 °F], 100 kPa). Infobox references

Uranium ruthenium silicide (URu_{2}Si_{2}) is a heavy fermion alloy composed of uranium, ruthenium, and silicon. URu_{2}Si_{2} has the same '122' tetragonal crystal structure as many other compounds of present condensed matter research. URu_{2}Si_{2} is a superconductor with a hastatic order (HO) phase below a temperature of 17.5 K. Below this temperature, it is magnetic, and below about 1.5 K it superconducts. However, the nature of the ordered phase below 17.5K is still under debate despite a wide variety of scenarios that have been proposed to explain this phase.
