= Hanne Wandtke =

- Born: 19 November 1939 (age 86); Dresden
- Education: Palucca School of Dance
- Known for: Choreography

Hanne Wandtke (born 19 November 1939 in Dresden) is a contemporary dancer and choreographer. She was director of the Palucca School of Dance, Dresden.

In 2000, she was awarded the Order of Merit of the Free State of Saxony. In 2004, she was awarded the City of Dresden Art Prize.

== Life ==
From 1954 to 1960, she studied at the Palucca School of Dance, Dresden. From 1960 to 1962, she danced at the Deutsches Nationaltheater and Staatskapelle Weimar. From 1962 to 1966, she danced at the ballet of the Dresden State Opera. Due to her use of improvisation, which could be used to address controversial subject matter, she was put under observation by the Stasi, along with other members of the performance art group Autoperforationsartisten. She began performing with the group in the mid 1980s, although she is rarely mentioned in literature on Autoperforationsartisten, due to her prominent position at the Palucca School. In the late 1990s, she co-founded the artists' collective and music/art space blauFABRIK.
