= Y&R =

Y&R may refer to:

- The Young and the Restless, an American soap opera
- Young & Rubicam, an advertising agency
- Young and Restless (Australian band), a band from Canberra, Australia formed in 2005
