= Peter Fulde =

German physicist (1936–2024)

- Born: 6 April 1936; Breslau, Gau Silesia, Nazi Germany
- Died: 11 April 2024 (aged 88); Dresden, Saxony, Germany
- Education: University of Hamburg; University of Maryland, College Park
- Known for: Fulde-Ferrell-Larkin-Ovchinnikov phase
- Awards: Tsungming Tu Award (2009); Marian-Smoluchowski-Emil-Warburg-Award (2011)
- Scientific career
- Fields: Theoretical Physics
- Workplaces: University of Maryland, College Park; University of California, Berkeley; University of Frankfurt/M; Institut Laue-Langevin; Garching; Max-Planck-Gesellschaft, Stuttgart; Max-Planck-Gesellschaft, Dresden; POSTECH, Pohang, Korea
- Thesis: Depairing in superconductors (1963)
- Doctoral advisor: Richard A. Ferrell

Peter Fulde (6 April 1936 – 11 April 2024) was a German physicist working in condensed matter theory and quantum chemistry.

== Biography ==
Fulde received a PhD degree at the University of Maryland in 1963. After spending more than one year as a postdoc with Michael Tinkham in Berkeley, he returned in 1965 to Germany where he obtained a chair for theoretical physics in 1968 at the Johann Wolfgang Goethe University in Frankfurt/M. From 1971 to 1974 he was in charge of the theory group of the Institute Max von Laue-Paul Langevin in Garching. In 1971 he became a director at the Max Planck Institute for Solid State Research in Stuttgart where he served until 1993 when he became the founding director of the Max Planck Institute for the Physics of Complex Systems in Dresden. After his retirement in 2007 he became president of the Asia Pacific Center for Theoretical Physics and a faculty member at POSTECH in Pohang (Korea). He directed the center until 2013.

Fulde has made numerous contributions to condensed matter physics including superconductivity and correlated electrons in molecules and solids. Particularly known is the Fulde-Ferrell-Larkin-Ovchinnikov (FFLO) phase which may occur when fermions with imbalanced populations are paired.

Fulde was a founding member of the Berlin-Brandenburg Academy of Sciences and Humanities (former Preussische Akadamie der Wissenschaften). He was a member of the German Academy of Sciences Leopoldina and Deutsche Akademie für Technikwissenschaften (acatech). Among his awards are the Order of Merit of the Free State of Saxony (2007), the Tsungming Tu Award of the National Science Council of Taiwan (2009) and the Marian-Smoluchowski-Emil-Warburg-Award of the German and Polish Physical Societies (2011). He was an Honorary Citizen of the Province Gyeongsangbuk do of the Republic of Korea (2014) and of the City of Pohang (2016).

Fulde died in Dresden, Saxony on 11 April 2024, at the age of 88.

== Selected publications ==
- Fulde, Peter; Ferrell, Richard A. (1964-08-03). "Superconductivity in a Strong Spin-Exchange Field". Physical Review. 135 (3A). American Physical Society (APS): A550–A563. Bibcode:1964PhRv..135..550F. doi:10.1103/physrev.135.a550. ISSN 0031-899X. OSTI 5017462.
- Meservey, R.; Tedrow, P. M.; Fulde, Peter (1970-11-02). "Magnetic Field Splitting of the Quasiparticle States in Superconducting Aluminum Films". Physical Review Letters. 25 (18). American Physical Society (APS): 1270–1272. Bibcode:1970PhRvL..25.1270M. doi:10.1103/physrevlett.25.1270. ISSN 0031-9007.
- P. Fulde “Crystal fields”, Chapter 17 in "Handbook on the physics and chemistry of rare-earth", ed. by K. A. Gschneider and L. Eyring; North-Holland Publ. Comp. (1978) doi:10.1016/S0168-1273(79)02008-0
- "Electron Correlations in Molecules and Solids", 480 pp. (Springer, Heidelberg 1991, 1993, 1995) Fulde, Peter (1995). Third Enlarged Edition. Springer. ISBN 3-540-59364-0.
- "Correlated Electrons in Quantum Matter", 535 pp. (World Scientific, Singapore, 2012); ebook ISBN 978-981-4390-91-0; pbk ISBN 978-981-4390-92-7

== See also ==
- Fulde-Ferrell-Larkin-Ovchinnikov phase
