= Fulde–Ferrell–Larkin–Ovchinnikov phase =

Phase of matter in superconductors

The Fulde–Ferrell–Larkin–Ovchinnikov (FFLO) phase (also occasionally called the Larkin–Ovchinnikov–Fulde–Ferrell phase, or LOFF) can arise in a superconductor under large magnetic fields. Among its characteristics are Cooper pairs with nonzero total momentum and a spatially non-uniform order parameter, leading to normally conducting areas in the system.

== History ==
Two independent publications in 1964, one by Peter Fulde and Richard A. Ferrell and the other by Anatoly Larkin and Yuri Ovchinnikov, theoretically predicted a new state appearing in a certain regime of superconductors at low temperatures and in high magnetic fields. This particular superconducting state is nowadays known as the Fulde–Ferrell–Larkin–Ovchinnikov state, abbreviated FFLO state (also LOFF state). Since then, experimental observations of the FFLO state have been searched for in different classes of superconducting materials, first in thin films and later in more exotic superconductors such as heavy-fermion and organic superconductors. Good evidence for the existence of the FFLO state was found in organic superconductors using nuclear magnetic resonance (NMR) and studies of heat capacity. In recent years, the concept of the FFLO state has been used in the field of atomic physics and experiments to detect the state in atomic ensembles in optical lattices. Moreover, there are indicators of the FFLO phase existence in two-component Fermi gases confined in a harmonic potential. These signatures are suppressed neither by phase separation nor by vortex lattice formation.

== Theory ==
If a BCS superconductor with a ground state consisting of Cooper pair singlets (and center-of-mass momentum q = 0) is subjected to an applied magnetic field, then the spin structure is not affected until the Zeeman energy is strong enough to flip one spin of the singlet and break the Cooper pair, thus destroying superconductivity (paramagnetic or Pauli pair breaking). If instead one considers the normal, metallic state at the same finite magnetic field, then the Zeeman energy leads to different Fermi surfaces for spin-up and spin-down electrons, which can lead to superconducting pairing where Cooper pair singlets are formed with a finite center-of-mass momentum q, corresponding to the displacement of the two Fermi surfaces. A non-vanishing pairing momentum leads to a spatially modulated order parameter with wave vector q.

== Experiment ==
For the FFLO phase to appear, it is required that Pauli paramagnetic pair-breaking is the relevant mechanism to suppress superconductivity (Pauli limiting field, also Chandrasekhar-Clogston limit). In particular, orbital pair breaking (when the vortices induced by the magnetic field overlap in space) has to be weaker, which is not the case for most conventional superconductors. Certain unusual superconductors, on the other hand, may favor Pauli pair breaking: materials with large effective electron mass or layered materials (with quasi-two-dimensional electrical conduction).

=== Heavy-fermion superconductors ===
Heavy-fermion superconductivity is caused by electrons with a drastically enhanced effective mass (the heavy fermions, also heavy quasiparticles), which suppresses orbital pair breaking. Furthermore, certain heavy-fermion superconductors, such as CeCoIn_{5}, have a layered crystal structure, with somewhat two-dimensional electronic transport properties. Indeed, in CeCoIn_{5} there is thermodynamic evidence for the existence of an unconventional low temperature phase within the superconducting state. Subsequently, neutron diffraction experiments showed that this phase also exhibits incommensurate antiferromagnetic order and that the superconducting and magnetic ordering phenomena are coupled to one another.

=== Organic superconductors ===
Most organic superconductors are strongly anisotropic, in particular there are charge-transfer salts based on the molecule BEDT-TTF (or ET, "bisethylendithiotetrathiofulvalene") or BEDT-TSF (or BETS, "bisethylendithiotetraselenafulvalene") that are highly two-dimensional. In one plane, the electric conductivity is high compared to a direction perpendicular to the plane. When applying large magnetic fields exactly parallel to the conducting planes, penetration depth demonstrates and specific heat confirms the existence of the FFLO state. This finding was corroborated by NMR data that proved the existence of an inhomogeneous superconducting state, most probably the FFLO state.
