= Quantum critical point =

Term in condensed matter physics

A quantum critical point is a point in the phase diagram of a material where a continuous phase transition takes place at absolute zero. A quantum critical point is typically achieved by a continuous suppression of a nonzero temperature phase transition to zero temperature by the application of a pressure, field, or through doping. Conventional phase transitions occur at nonzero temperature when the growth of random thermal fluctuations leads to a change in the physical state of a system. Condensed matter physics research over the past few decades has revealed a new class of phase transitions called quantum phase transitions which take place at absolute zero. In the absence of the thermal fluctuations which trigger conventional phase transitions, quantum phase transitions are driven by the zero point quantum fluctuations associated with Heisenberg's uncertainty principle that connects energy and time fluctuations. This implies that the dynamic critical exponent z that governs the scaling of time at the quantum critical point enters in the scaling expression for the free energy, even at finite temperatures.

== Overview ==
Within the class of phase transitions, there are two main categories: at a first-order phase transition, the properties shift discontinuously, as in the melting of solid, whereas at a second order phase transition, the state of the system changes in a continuous fashion. Second-order phase transitions are marked by the growth of fluctuations on ever-longer length-scales. These fluctuations are called "critical fluctuations". At the critical point where a second-order transition occurs the critical fluctuations are scale invariant and extend over the entire system. At a nonzero temperature phase transition, the fluctuations that develop at a critical point are governed by classical physics, because the characteristic energy of quantum fluctuations is always smaller than the characteristic Boltzmann thermal energy $k_B T$.

At a quantum critical point, the critical fluctuations are quantum mechanical in nature, exhibiting scale invariance in both space and in time. Unlike classical critical points, where the critical fluctuations are limited to a narrow region around the phase transition, the influence of a quantum critical point is felt over a wide range of temperatures above the quantum critical point, so the effect of quantum criticality is felt without ever reaching absolute zero. Quantum criticality was first observed in ferroelectrics, in which the ferroelectric transition temperature is suppressed to zero.

A wide variety of metallic ferromagnets and antiferromagnets have been observed to develop quantum critical behavior when their magnetic transition temperature is driven to zero through the application of pressure, chemical doping or magnetic fields. In these cases, the properties of the metal are radically transformed by the critical fluctuations, departing qualitatively from the standard Fermi liquid behavior, to form a metallic state sometimes called a non-Fermi liquid or a "strange metal". Non-Fermi liquids are believed to be important in the research of superconductivity as the process of their formation bears a resemblance to that of some superconductors. Quantum critical fluctuations have also been shown to drive the formation of exotic magnetic phases in the vicinity of quantum critical points.

== Quantum critical endpoints ==
Quantum critical points arise when a susceptibility diverges at zero temperature. There are a number of materials (such as CeNi_{2}Ge_{2}) where this occurs serendipitously. More frequently a material has to be tuned to a quantum critical point. Most commonly this is done by taking a system with a second-order phase transition which occurs at nonzero temperature and tuning it—for example by applying pressure or magnetic field or changing its chemical composition. CePd_{2}Si_{2} is such an example, where the antiferromagnetic transition which occurs at about 10K under ambient pressure can be tuned to zero temperature by applying a pressure of 28,000 atmospheres. Less commonly a first-order transition can be made quantum critical. First-order transitions do not normally show critical fluctuations as the material moves discontinuously from one phase into another. However, if the first order phase transition does not involve a change of symmetry then the phase diagram can contain a critical endpoint where the first-order phase transition terminates. Such an endpoint has a divergent susceptibility. The transition between the liquid and gas phases is an example of a first-order transition without a change of symmetry and the critical endpoint is characterized by critical fluctuations known as critical opalescence.

A quantum critical endpoint arises when a nonzero temperature critical point is tuned to zero temperature. One of the best studied examples occurs in the layered ruthenate metal, Sr_{3}Ru_{2}O_{7} in a magnetic field. This material shows metamagnetism with a low-temperature first-order metamagnetic transition where the magnetization jumps when a magnetic field is applied within the directions of the layers. The first-order jump terminates in a critical endpoint at about 1 kelvin. By switching the direction of the magnetic field so that it points almost perpendicular to the layers, the critical endpoint is tuned to zero temperature at a field of about 8 teslas. The resulting quantum critical fluctuations dominate the physical properties of this material at nonzero temperatures and away from the critical field. The resistivity shows a non-Fermi liquid response, the effective mass of the electron grows and the magnetothermal expansion of the material is modified all in response to the quantum critical fluctuations.
