= UPt3 =

Uranium platinum

Names
- Other names Platinum--uranium (3/1)

Identifiers
CAS Number	12311-92-1
3D model (JSmol)	Interactive image
ChemSpider	57534709
PubChem CID	71354824
CompTox Dashboard (EPA)	DTXSID90779273
- InChI: InChI=1S/3Pt.U Key: YYBWTXHBZRZQRM-UHFFFAOYSA-N
- SMILES: [Pt].[Pt].[Pt].[U]

Properties
Chemical formula	UPt_{3}
Molar mass	823.3 g/mol
Density	19.3 g/cm^{3}
Melting point	1700°C

Structure
Crystal structure	see text
Space group	P6_{3}/mmc

Thermochemistry
Std molar entropy (S^{⦵}_{298})	−111 J·mol^{−1}·K^{−1}
- Except where otherwise noted, data are given for materials in their standard state (at 25 °C [77 °F], 100 kPa). Infobox references

UPt_{3} is an inorganic binary intermetallic crystalline compound of platinum and uranium.

== Production ==
It can be synthesised as an intermetallic compound, by direct fusion of pure components at 1700 °C according to stoichiometric calculations:

3 Pt + U → UPt_{3}

It can also be synthesised by reduction of uranium dioxide with hydrogen in the presence of platinum at 1700 °C:

UO_{2} + 2 H_{2} + 3 Pt → UPt_{3} + 2 H_{2}O

== Physical properties ==
UPt_{3} forms crystals of hexagonal symmetry (some studies hypothesize a trigonal structure instead), space group P6_{3}/mmc, cell parameters a = 0.5766 nm and c = 0.4898 nm (c should be understood as distance from planes), with a structure similar to nisnite (Ni_{3}Sn) and MgCd_{3}.

The compound congruently melts at 1700 °C. The enthalpy of formation of the compound is -111 kJ/mol.

At temperatures below 1 K it becomes superconducting. Due to the large effective mass of the conduction electrons, UPt_{3} is classed as a Heavy fermion superconductor.
