= Frank Steglich =

German physicist (born 1941)

Frank Steglich (born 14 March 1941) is a German physicist and the founding director of the Max Planck Institute for Chemical Physics of Solids in Dresden, Germany.

== Education and career ==
Steglich was born in Dresden and studied physics in the University of Münster and the University of Göttingen, where he received his PhD under Rudolf Hilsch.

Steglich discovered the first heavy fermion superconductor, CeCu_{2}Si_{2}, while working as a research associate in Cologne, Germany in 1979. CeCu_{2}Si_{2} is the first metallic system to be discovered in which the superconductivity is driven by electron-electron interactions, rather than the electron-phonon interaction that is responsible for conventional BCS superconductivity. The discovery of this material revolutionized research into superconductivity, establishing the reality of electronically mediated superconductivity and foreshadowing the discovery of a wide range of heavy electron superconductors, and the subsequent discovery of electronically mediated pairing in cuprates high temperature superconductors. The first published report of the phenomenon occurred in 1979, by which time Steglich had taken up a faculty position at the University of Darmstadt, and confirmed the existence of bulk superconductivity through the measurement of the specific heat anomaly at the transition temperature of T_{c}=0.5K.

== Honors and awards ==
Steglich won the Hewlett-Packard Europhysics Prize and the Gay-Lussac-Humboldt Prize in 1989, the American Physical Society International Prize for New Materials in 1990, the IUPAP Magnetism Award in 2000, the Stern-Gerlach Medal in 2004, the Bernd T. Matthias Prize for Superconducting Materials in 2006 and the Fritz London Memorial Prize in 2020. Steglich received the Gottfried Wilhelm Leibniz Prize by the Deutsche Forschungsgemeinschaft in 1986 and a number of other recognitions. He has been the Vice President of the Deutsche Forschungsgemeinschaft (German Research Foundation).

Steglich is member of several Academies of Sciences and Fellow of the American Physical Society. He received honorary doctorates from the universities of Augsburg, Cologne and Frankfurt/Main as well Kraków (Poland). Since 2012 he is distinguished visiting professor at the Institute of Physics, Chinese Academy of Sciences (Beijing) and at Zhejiang University, Hangzhou (China). At the latter school he became founding director of the Center for Correlated Matter (CCM) in 2012.
