= Effective mass (solid-state physics) =

Mass of a particle when interacting with other particles

In solid state physics, a particle's effective mass (often denoted $m^*$) is the mass that it seems to have when responding to forces, or the mass that it seems to have when interacting with other identical particles in a thermal distribution. One of the results from the band theory of solids is that the movement of particles in a periodic potential, over long distances larger than the lattice spacing, can be very different from their motion in a vacuum. The effective mass is a quantity that is used to simplify band structures by modeling the behavior of a free particle with that mass. For some purposes and some materials, the effective mass can be considered to be a simple constant of a material. In general, however, the value of effective mass depends on the purpose for which it is used, and can vary depending on a number of factors.

For electrons or electron holes in a solid, the effective mass is usually stated as a factor multiplying the rest mass of an electron, m_{e} (9.11 × 10^{−31} kg). This factor is usually in the range 0.01 to 10, but can be lower or higher—for example, reaching 1,000 in exotic heavy fermion materials, or anywhere from zero to infinity (depending on definition) in graphene. As it simplifies the more general band theory, the electronic effective mass can be seen as an important basic parameter that influences measurable properties of a solid, including everything from the efficiency of a solar cell to the speed of an integrated circuit.

== Simple case: parabolic, isotropic dispersion relation ==
At the highest energies of the valence band in many semiconductors (Ge, Si, GaAs, ...), and the lowest energies of the conduction band in some semiconductors (GaAs, ...), the band structure E(k) can be locally approximated as

$$E(\mathbf k) = E_0 + \frac{\hbar^2 \mathbf k^2}{2 m^*}$$

where E(k) is the energy of an electron at wavevector k in that band, E_{0} is a constant giving the edge of energy of that band, and m^{*} is a constant (the effective mass).

It can be shown that the electrons placed in these bands behave as free electrons except with a different mass, as long as their energy stays within the range of validity of the approximation above. As a result, the electron mass in models such as the Drude model must be replaced with the effective mass.

One remarkable property is that the effective mass can become negative, when the band curves downwards away from a maximum. As a result of the negative mass, the electrons respond to electric and magnetic forces by gaining velocity in the opposite direction compared to normal; even though these electrons have negative charge, they move in trajectories as if they had positive charge (and positive mass). This explains the existence of valence-band holes, the positive-charge, positive-mass quasiparticles that can be found in semiconductors.

In any case, if the band structure has the simple parabolic form described above, then the value of effective mass is unambiguous. Unfortunately, this parabolic form is not valid for describing most materials. In such complex materials there is no single definition of "effective mass" but instead multiple definitions, each suited to a particular purpose. The rest of the article describes these effective masses in detail.

== Intermediate case: parabolic, anisotropic dispersion relation ==
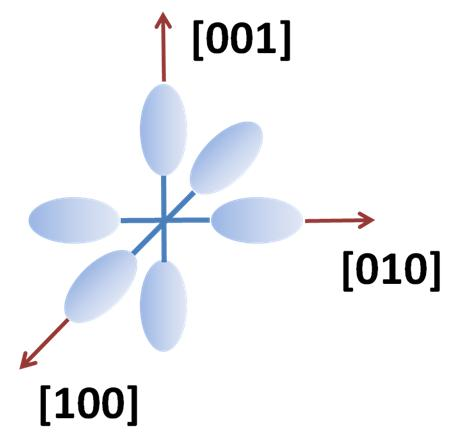
Constant energy ellipsoids in silicon near the six conduction band minima. For each valley (band minimum), the effective masses are m_{ℓ} = 0.92m_{e} ("longitudinal"; along one axis) and m_{t} = 0.19m_{e} ("transverse"; along two axes).

In some important semiconductors (notably, silicon) the lowest energies of the conduction band are not symmetrical, as the constant-energy surfaces are now ellipsoids, rather than the spheres in the isotropic case. Each conduction band minimum can be approximated only by

$$E\left(\mathbf{k}\right) =
E_0 + \frac{\hbar^2}{2 m_x^*}\left(k_x - k_{0,x}\right)^2 + \frac{\hbar^2}{2 m_y^*}\left(k_y - k_{0,y}\right)^2 + \frac{\hbar^2}{2 m_z^*}\left(k_z - k_{0,z}\right)^2$$

where x, y, and z axes are aligned to the principal axes of the ellipsoids, and m^{*}_{x}, m^{*}_{y} and m^{*}_{z} are the inertial effective masses along these different axes. The offsets k_{0,x}, k_{0,y}, and k_{0,z} reflect that the conduction band minimum is no longer centered at zero wavevector. (These effective masses correspond to the principal components of the inertial effective mass tensor, described later.)

In this case, the electron motion is no longer directly comparable to a free electron; the speed of an electron will depend on its direction, and it will accelerate to a different degree depending on the direction of the force. Still, in crystals such as silicon the overall properties such as conductivity appear to be isotropic. This is because there are multiple valleys (conduction-band minima), each with effective masses rearranged along different axes. The valleys collectively act together to give an isotropic conductivity. It is possible to average the different axes' effective masses together in some way, to regain the free electron picture. However, the averaging method turns out to depend on the purpose:

- For calculation of the total density of states and the total carrier density, via the geometric mean combined with a degeneracy factor g which counts the number of valleys (in silicon g = 6):
  $$m^*_\text{density} = \sqrt[3]{g^2 m_x m_y m_z}$$
  (This effective mass corresponds to the density of states effective mass, described later.)
  For the per-valley density of states and per-valley carrier density, the degeneracy factor is left out.
- For the purposes of calculating conductivity as in the Drude model, via the harmonic mean
  $$m^*_\text{conductivity} = 3 \left[\frac{1}{m_x^*} + \frac{1}{m_y^*} + \frac{1}{m_z^*}\right]^{-1}$$
  Since the Drude law also depends on scattering time, which varies greatly, this effective mass is rarely used; conductivity is instead usually expressed in terms of carrier density and an empirically measured parameter, carrier mobility.

== General case ==
In general the dispersion relation cannot be approximated as parabolic, and in such cases the effective mass should be precisely defined if it is to be used at all. Here a commonly stated definition of effective mass is the inertial effective mass tensor defined below; however, in general it is a matrix-valued function of the wavevector, and even more complex than the band structure. Other effective masses are more relevant to directly measurable phenomena.

=== Inertial effective mass tensor ===
A classical particle under the influence of a force accelerates according to Newton's second law, a = m^{−1}F, or alternatively, the momentum changes according to d/dtp = F. This intuitive principle appears identically in semiclassical approximations derived from band structure when interband transitions can be ignored for sufficiently weak external fields. The force gives a rate of change in crystal momentum p_{crystal}:

$$\mathbf{F} =
\frac{\operatorname{d}\mathbf{p}_{\text{crystal}}}{\operatorname{d}t} =
\hbar\frac{\operatorname{d}\mathbf{k}}{\operatorname{d}t},$$

where ħ = h/2π is the reduced Planck constant.

Acceleration for a wave-like particle becomes the rate of change in group velocity:

$$\mathbf{a} =
\frac{\operatorname{d}}{\operatorname{d}t}\,\mathbf{v}_\text{g} =
\frac{\operatorname{d}}{\operatorname{d}t}\left(\nabla_k\,\omega\left(\mathbf{k}\right)\right) =
\nabla_k\frac{\operatorname{d}\omega\left(\mathbf{k}\right)}{\operatorname{d}t} =
\nabla_k\left(\frac{\operatorname{d}\mathbf{k}}{\operatorname{d}t}\cdot\nabla_k\,\omega(\mathbf{k})\right),$$

where ∇_{k} is the del operator in reciprocal space. The last step follows from using the chain rule for a total derivative for a quantity with indirect dependencies, because the direct result of the force is the change in k(t) given above, which indirectly results in a change in E(k)=ħω(k). Combining these two equations yields

$$\mathbf{a} = \nabla_k\left(\frac{\mathbf{F}}{\hbar}\cdot\nabla_k\,\frac{E(\mathbf{k})}{\hbar}\right)=\frac{1}{\hbar^2} \left(\nabla_k\left(\nabla_k\,E(\mathbf{k})\right)\right)\cdot\mathbf{F}=M_{\text{inert}}^{-1}\cdot\mathbf{F}$$

using the dot product rule with a uniform force (∇_{k}F=0). $\nabla_k\left(\nabla_k\,E(\mathbf{k})\right)$ is the Hessian matrix of E(k) in reciprocal space. We see that the equivalent of the Newtonian reciprocal inertial mass for a free particle defined by a = m^{−1}F has become a tensor quantity

$$M_{\text{inert}}^{-1}=\frac{1}{\hbar^2} \nabla_k\left(\nabla_k\,E(\mathbf{k})\right).$$

whose elements are

$$\left[M_{\text{inert}}^{-1}\right]_{ij} = \frac{1}{\hbar^2}  \left[\nabla_k\left(\nabla_k\,E(\mathbf{k})\right)\right]_{ij} = \frac{1}{\hbar^2} \frac{\partial^2 E}{\partial k_i \partial k_j}\,.$$

This tensor allows the acceleration and force to be in different directions, and for the magnitude of the acceleration to depend on the direction of the force.

- For parabolic bands, the off-diagonal elements of M_{inert}^{−1} are zero, and the diagonal elements are constants
- For isotropic bands the diagonal elements must all be equal and the off-diagonal elements must all be equal.
- For parabolic isotropic bands, M_{inert}^{−1} = 1/m^{*}I, where m^{*} is a scalar effective mass and I is the identity.
- In general, the elements of M_{inert}^{−1} are functions of k.
- The inverse, M_{inert} = (M_{inert}^{−1})^{−1}, is known as the effective mass tensor. Note that it is not always possible to invert M_{inert}^{−1}

For bands with linear dispersion $E\propto k$ such as with photons or electrons in graphene, the group velocity is fixed, i.e. electrons travelling with parallel with k to the force direction F cannot be accelerated and the diagonal elements of M_{inert}^{−1} are obviously zero. However, electrons travelling with a component perpendicular to the force can be accelerated in the direction of the force, and the off-diagonal elements of M_{inert}^{−1} are non-zero. In fact the off-diagonal elements scale inversely with k, i.e. they diverge (become infinite) for small k. This is why the electrons in graphene are sometimes said to have infinite mass (due to the zeros on the diagonal of M_{inert}^{−1}) and sometimes said to be massless (due to the divergence on the off-diagonals).

=== Cyclotron effective mass ===
Classically, a charged particle in a magnetic field moves in a helix along the magnetic field axis. The period T of its motion depends on its mass m and charge e,

$$T = \left\vert\frac{2\pi m}{e B}\right\vert$$

where B is the magnetic flux density.

For particles in asymmetrical band structures, the particle no longer moves exactly in a helix, however its motion transverse to the magnetic field still moves in a closed loop (not necessarily a circle). Moreover, the time to complete one of these loops still varies inversely with magnetic field, and so it is possible to define a cyclotron effective mass from the measured period, using the above equation.

The semiclassical motion of the particle can be described by a closed loop in k-space. Throughout this loop, the particle maintains a constant energy, as well as a constant momentum along the magnetic field axis. By defining A to be the k-space area enclosed by this loop (this area depends on the energy E, the direction of the magnetic field, and the on-axis wavevector k_{B}), then it can be shown that the cyclotron effective mass depends on the band structure via the derivative of this area in energy:

$$m^*\left(E, \hat{B}, k_{\hat{B}}\right) = \frac{\hbar^2}{2\pi} \cdot \frac{\partial}{\partial E} A\left(E, \hat{B}, k_{\hat{B}}\right)$$

Typically, experiments that measure cyclotron motion (cyclotron resonance, De Haas–Van Alphen effect, etc.) are restricted to only probe motion for energies near the Fermi level.

In two-dimensional electron gases, the cyclotron effective mass is defined only for one magnetic field direction (perpendicular) and the out-of-plane wavevector drops out. The cyclotron effective mass therefore is only a function of energy, and it turns out to be exactly related to the density of states at that energy via the relation $\scriptstyle g(E) \;=\; \frac{g_v m^*}{\pi \hbar^2}$, where g_{v} is the valley degeneracy. Such a simple relationship does not apply in three-dimensional materials.

=== Density of states effective masses (lightly doped semiconductors) ===
Density of states effective mass in various semiconductors
Group	Material	Electron	Hole
IV	Si (4 K)	1.06	0.59
IV	Si (300 K)	1.09	1.15
IV	Ge	0.55	0.37
III–V	GaAs	0.067	0.45
III–V	InSb	0.013	0.6
II–VI	ZnO	0.29	1.21
II–VI	ZnSe	0.17	1.44

In semiconductors with low levels of doping, the electron concentration in the conduction band is in general given by

$$n_\text{e} = N_\text{C} \exp\left(-\frac{E_\text{C} - E_\text{F}}{kT}\right)$$

where E_{F} is the Fermi level, E_{C} is the minimum energy of the conduction band, and N_{C} is a concentration coefficient that depends on temperature. The above relationship for n_{e} can be shown to apply for any conduction band shape (including non-parabolic, asymmetric bands), provided the doping is weak (E_{C} − E_{F} ≫ kT); this is a consequence of Fermi–Dirac statistics limiting towards Maxwell–Boltzmann statistics.

The concept of effective mass is useful to model the temperature dependence of N_{C}, thereby allowing the above relationship to be used over a range of temperatures. In an idealized three-dimensional material with a parabolic band, the concentration coefficient is given by

$$\quad N_\text{C} = 2\left(\frac{2\pi m_\text{e}^* kT}{h^2}\right)^\frac{3}{2}$$

In semiconductors with non-simple band structures, this relationship is used to define an effective mass, known as the density of states effective mass of electrons. The name "density of states effective mass" is used since the above expression for N_{C} is derived via the density of states for a parabolic band.

In practice, the effective mass extracted in this way is not quite constant in temperature (N_{C} does not exactly vary as T^{3/2}). In silicon, for example, this effective mass varies by a few percent between absolute zero and room temperature because the band structure itself slightly changes in shape. These band structure distortions are a result of changes in electron–phonon interaction energies, with the lattice's thermal expansion playing a minor role.

Similarly, the number of holes in the valence band, and the density of states effective mass of holes are defined by:

$$n_\text{h} = N_\text{V} \exp\left(-\frac{E_\text{F} - E_\text{V}}{kT}\right), \quad N_\text{V} = 2\left(\frac{2\pi m_\text{h}^* kT}{h^2}\right)^\frac{3}{2}$$

where E_{V} is the maximum energy of the valence band. Practically, this effective mass tends to vary greatly between absolute zero and room temperature in many materials (e.g., a factor of two in silicon), as there are multiple valence bands with distinct and significantly non-parabolic character, all peaking near the same energy.

== Determination ==
=== Experimental ===
Traditionally effective masses were measured using cyclotron resonance, a method in which microwave absorption of a semiconductor immersed in a magnetic field goes through a sharp peak when the microwave frequency equals the cyclotron frequency $\scriptstyle f_c \;=\; \frac{eB}{2\pi m^*}$. In recent years effective masses have more commonly been determined through measurement of band structures using techniques such as angle-resolved photoemission spectroscopy (ARPES) or, most directly, the de Haas–van Alphen effect. Effective masses can also be estimated using the coefficient γ of the linear term in the low-temperature electronic specific heat at constant volume $\scriptstyle c_v$. The specific heat depends on the effective mass through the density of states at the Fermi level and as such is a measure of degeneracy as well as band curvature. Very large estimates of carrier mass from specific heat measurements have given rise to the concept of heavy fermion materials. Since carrier mobility depends on the ratio of carrier collision lifetime $\tau$ to effective mass, masses can in principle be determined from transport measurements, but this method is not practical since carrier collision probabilities are typically not known a priori. The optical Hall effect is an emerging technique for measuring the free charge carrier density, effective mass and mobility parameters in semiconductors. The optical Hall effect measures the analogue of the quasi-static electric-field-induced electrical Hall effect at optical frequencies in conductive and complex layered materials. The optical Hall effect also permits characterization of the anisotropy (tensor character) of the effective mass and mobility parameters.

=== Theoretical ===
A variety of theoretical methods including density functional theory, k·p perturbation theory, and others are used to supplement and support the various experimental measurements described in the previous section, including interpreting, fitting, and extrapolating these measurements. Some of these theoretical methods can also be used for ab initio predictions of effective mass in the absence of any experimental data, for example to study materials that have not yet been created in the laboratory.

== Significance ==
The effective mass is used in transport calculations, such as transport of electrons under the influence of fields or carrier gradients, but it also is used to calculate the carrier density and density of states in semiconductors. These masses are related but, as explained in the previous sections, are not the same because the weightings of various directions and wavevectors are different. These differences are important, for example in thermoelectric materials, where high conductivity, generally associated with light mass, is desired at the same time as high Seebeck coefficient, generally associated with heavy mass. Methods for assessing the electronic structures of different materials in this context have been developed.

Certain group III–V compounds such as gallium arsenide (GaAs) and indium antimonide (InSb) have far smaller effective masses than tetrahedral group IV materials like silicon and germanium. In the simplest Drude picture of electronic transport, the maximum obtainable charge carrier velocity is inversely proportional to the effective mass: $\vec{v} \;=\; \left\Vert \mu \right\Vert \cdot \vec{E}$, where $\left\Vert \mu \right\Vert \;=\; {e \tau}/{\left\Vert m^* \right\Vert}$ with $e$ being the electronic charge. The ultimate speed of integrated circuits depends on the carrier velocity, so the low effective mass is the fundamental reason that GaAs and its derivatives are used instead of Si in high-bandwidth applications like cellular telephony.

In April 2017, researchers at Washington State University claimed to have created a fluid with negative effective mass inside a Bose–Einstein condensate, by engineering the dispersion relation.

== See also ==
Models of solids and crystals:

- Tight-binding model
- Free electron model
- Nearly free electron model
