= Paul Wiegmann =

Russian physicist

- Paul Wiegmann
- Born: November 8, 1952 (age 73); Ryazan, Russia
- Education: Moscow Institute of Physics and Technology, 1975; Landau Institute for Theoretical Physics, 1984
- Known for: Exact Solution of Kondo model, O(3) Non-linear Sigma Model
- Scientific career
- Fields: Theoretical Physics
- Workplaces: University of Chicago
- Doctoral advisor: Anatoly Larkin

Paul B. Wiegmann (Павел Борисович Вигман) is a Russian physicist. He is the Robert W. Reneker Distinguished Service Professor in the Department of Physics at the University of Chicago, James Franck Institute and Enrico Fermi Institute. He specializes in theoretical condensed matter physics. He made pioneering contributions to the field of quantum integrable systems. He found exact solutions of O(3) Non-linear Sigma Model, (Wiegmann 1985), Wess–Zumino–Witten model (together with Alexander Polyakov), Anderson impurity model and multi-channel Kondo model (with Alexei Tsvelik).

== Notable Achievements and Scientific Recognition ==
In 2003, Paul Wiegmann was elected a Fellow of the American Physical Society, the official citation indicating that the recognition was "For exact solutions of models of interacting electronic systems and quantum field theory, including the multi-channel Kondo problem and the Anderson model for magnetic impurities."

== Awards and Distinguished Appointments ==
- Lady Davis Fellowship, 2000
- Humboldt Research Award, Alexander von Humboldt Foundation, 2002
- Fellow of American Physical Society, 2003
- Kramers Chair, Spinoza Institute, 2003
- Blaise Pascal Chair, Ile de France, 2006
- Lars Onsager Prize, 2017

== Publications ==
- Tsvelick, A.M.; Wiegmann, P.B. (1983). "Exact results in the theory of magnetic alloys". Advances in Physics. 32 (4). Taylor & Francis: 453–713. Bibcode:1983AdPhy..32..453T. doi:10.1080/00018738300101581.
- Wiegmann, Paul (1985). "Exact solution of O(3) nonlinear two-dimensional sigma model". JETP Letters. 41 (2). JETP Letters: 95–100. Bibcode:1985JETPL..41...95W. Archived from the original on 2019-11-01.
- Polyakov, A.M.; Wiegmann, P.B. (1984). "Goldstone fields in two dimensions with multivalued actions". Physics Letters. B 141 (3–4). Physics Letters: 223–228. Bibcode:1984PhLB..141..223P. doi:10.1016/0370-2693(84)90206-5.

According to the Inspire High-Energy Physics database, Paul Wiegmann's author profile includes more than 2700 citations, several very well-known papers, and famous papers, and over 45 citations per article.
