= Suchitra Sebastian =

Condensed matter physicist

- Citizenship: Indian
- Education: Women's Christian College Indian Institute of Management, Ahmedabad Stanford University
- Known for: Dual insulating and conduction-like behaviour of samarium hexaboride
- Awards: Breakthrough Foundation New Horizons in Physics Prize (2022); Philip Leverhulme Prize (2015); L'Oréal-UNESCO Awards for Women in Science (2013)
- Scientific career
- Fields: Condensed matter physics
- Workplaces: University of Cambridge
- Thesis: Bose-Einstein Condensation in Spin Dimer Compounds
- Doctoral advisor: Ian Fisher
- Website: https://www.quantum-materials.phy.cam.ac.uk/

Suchitra Sebastian is a condensed matter physicist at Cavendish Laboratory, University of Cambridge. She is known for her discoveries of exotic quantum phenomena that emerge in complex materials. In particular, she is known for the discovery of unconventional insulating materials which display simultaneous conduction-like behaviour. In 2022 she was awarded the New Horizons in Physics Prize by the Breakthrough Foundation. She was named as one of thirty Exceptional Young Scientists by the World Economic Forum in 2013, one of The Next Big Names in Physics by the Financial Times in 2013, and spoke at the World Economic Forum at Davos in 2016.

== Biography ==
Suchitra Sebastian obtained an undergraduate degree in physics from the Women's Christian College, Chennai. She attended the Indian Institute of Management, Ahmedabad, where she received an MBA. She received a PhD in Applied Physics from Stanford University. She was a Junior Research Fellow in Physics at Trinity College, Cambridge, subsequently a Royal Society University Research Fellow, and currently a professor of physics at the Cavendish Laboratory, University of Cambridge.

Sebastian is active in the arts, and performs in theatre. She is the founder director of the Cavendish Arts Science Programme at the University of Cambridge. She has performed at the Edinburgh Festival Fringe in plays including The Djinns of Eidgah,. She co-founded Bread Theatre and Film Company with Ananya Mishra, with branches at the university of Cambridge and in London.

== Career ==
After her MBA degree, Sebastian worked as a management consultant for a few years. She then decided to pursue physics as a career, and joined Stanford University for a PhD.

Suchitra Sebastian's doctoral research was into barium copper silicate's transformation from a non-magnetic into a magnetic insulator under high magnetic field and low temperature. She discovered that the point of phase transition, the quantum critical point, occurs when the electrons' behaviour becomes two-dimensional, with the third dimension having almost no effect. In 2006, she co-published a paper revealing these findings. When the silicate is in its insulating state, the electron spins cancel each other out, but in the magnetic phase, under strong magnetic fields and low temperatures, the electrons form a Bose-Einstein condensate, with the electron spins suddenly unified. At the critical point, the spins from parallel layers stop affecting each other, and the magnetic waves stay within the plane of each layer, propagating in two dimensions. Sebastian's experiment was the first exploration of the immediate neighbourhood of the critical point in Bose-Einstein condensates.

Sebastian has also actively worked on the cuprates to determine why they behave as high temperature superconductors. This entailed the suppression of superconductivity under strong magnetic fields, and the examination of their resistive state. This revealed that electrons were forming twisted pockets in the weakest areas of superconductivity, in contrast to other researchers' finding that pockets formed in strong superconductive regions. She also discovered that the waves formed by alignment of electrons by their charge, called charge ordering, produce the pockets that are involved in the substance's superconductivity.

In 2015, Sebastian and her team used high magnetic fields to study samarium hexaboride, a Kondo insulator at low temperatures. Sebastian found that samarium hexaboride acts as a simultaneous conductor and insulator within its bulk, the first of a new class of unconventional insulators.

== Awards ==
- (2007) Lee Osheroff Richardson North American Science prize
- (2012) Young Scientist Medal in Magnetism (International Union of Pure and Applied Physics)
- (2012) Moseley Medal (Institute of Physics)
- (2013) L'Oréal-UNESCO Awards for Women in Science
- (2015) Philip Leverhulme Prize
- (2015) Brian Pippard Prize
- (2022) Breakthrough Foundation New Horizons in Physics Prize

== Selected works ==
=== Popular exposition ===
- Sebastian, Suchitra (10 July 2015). "How we discovered 'impossible' material that both conducts electricity – and doesn't". The Conversation.

=== Technical articles ===
- Sebastian, Suchitra; et al. (2006). "Dimensional reduction at a quantum critical point". Nature. 441 (7093): 617–620. arXiv:cond-mat/0606042. Bibcode:2006Natur.441..617S. doi:10.1038/nature04732. PMID 16738655. S2CID 4416179.
- Sebastian, Suchitra (2012). "Quantum Oscillations in Iron Pnictide Superconductors". In Dai, Pencheng; Hosono, Hideo; Wang, Nan Lin (eds.). Magnetism and Superconductivity: from Cuprates to Iron-Pnictides. Pan Stanford. arXiv:1208.5862. Bibcode:2012arXiv1208.5862S.
- Sebastian, Suchitra; et al. (2014). "Normal-state nodal electronic structure in underdoped high-Tc copper oxides". Nature. 511 (7507): 61–4. arXiv:1507.01195. Bibcode:2014Natur.511...61S. doi:10.1038/nature13326. PMID 24930767. S2CID 205238687.
- Sebastian, Suchitra; et al. (2015). "Unconventional fermi surface in an insulating state". Science. 349 (6245): 287–90. arXiv:1507.01129. Bibcode:2015Sci...349..287T. doi:10.1126/science.aaa7974. PMID 26138105. S2CID 206635941.
