= Numerical renormalization group =

Technique for many-body problems

The numerical renormalization group (NRG) is a technique devised to solve certain quantum many-body problems where impurities play a key role. The numerical renormalization group is an iterative procedure, which is an example of a renormalization group technique.The numerical renormalization group is an inherently non-perturbative procedure, which was originally developed by Kenneth G. Wilson to solve the Kondo model in 1975.

== History ==
The Kondo model from the 1960s is a simplified theoretical model which describes a system of magnetic spin-1/2 impurities which couple to metallic conduction electrons (e.g. iron impurities in gold). This problem is notoriously difficult to tackle theoretically, since perturbative techniques break down at low-energy. However, Kenneth Wilson was able to prove for the first time using the numerical renormalization group that the ground state of the Kondo model is a singlet state. But perhaps more importantly, the notions of renormalization, fixed points, and renormalization group flow were introduced to the field of condensed matter physics — it is for this that Wilson won the Nobel Prize in Physics in 1982. The complete behaviour of the Kondo model, including both the high-temperature 'local moment' regime and the low-temperature 'strong coupling' regime are captured by the numerical renormalization group; an exponentially small energy scale T_{K} (not accessible from straight perturbation theory) was shown to govern all properties at low-energies, with all physical observables such as resistivity, thermodynamics, dynamics etc. exhibiting universal scaling. This is a characteristic feature of many problems in condensed matter physics, and is a central theme of quantum impurity physics in particular. In the original example of the Kondo model, the impurity local moment is completely screened below T_{K} by the conduction electrons via the celebrated Kondo effect; and one famous consequence is that such materials exhibit a resistivity minimum at low temperatures, contrary to expectations based purely on the standard phonon contribution, where the resistivity is predicted to decrease monotonically with temperature.

The very existence of local moments in real systems of course presupposes strong electron-electron correlations. The Anderson impurity model describes a quantum level with an onsite Coulomb repulsion between electrons (rather than a spin), which is tunnel-coupled to metallic conduction electrons. In the singly occupied regime of the impurity, one can derive the Kondo model from the Anderson model, but the latter contains other physics associated with charge fluctuations. The numerical renormalization group was extended to deal with the Anderson model (capturing thereby both Kondo physics and valence fluctuation physics) by H. R. Krishnamurthy et al. in 1980. Indeed, various important developments have been made since: a comprehensive modern review has been compiled by Bulla et al.

== Technique ==
The technique consists of first dividing the conduction band into logarithmic intervals (i.e. intervals which get smaller exponentially as you move closer to the Fermi energy). One conduction band state from each interval is retained, this being the totally symmetric combination of all the states in that interval. The conduction band has now been "logarithmically discretized". The Hamiltonian is now in a position to be transformed into so-called linear chain form, in which the impurity is coupled to only one conduction band state, which is coupled to one other conduction band state and so on. Crucially, these couplings decrease exponentially along the chain, so that, even though the transformed Hamiltonian is for an infinite chain, one can consider a chain of finite length and still obtain useful results.

The only restriction to the conduction-band is that it is non-interacting. Recent developments make it possible for mapping a general multi-channel conduction-band with channel mixing to a Wilson chain.

Once the Hamiltonian is in linear chain form, one can begin the iterative process. First the isolated impurity is considered, which will have some characteristic set of energy levels. One then considers adding the first conduction band orbital to the chain. This causes a splitting in the energy levels for the isolated impurity. One then considers the effect of adding further orbitals along the chain, doing which splits the hitherto derived energy levels further. Because the couplings decrease along the chain, the successive splittings caused by adding orbitals to the chain decrease.

When a particular number of orbitals have been added to the chain, we have a set of energy levels for that finite chain. This is obviously not the true set of energy levels for the infinite chain, but it is a good approximation to the true set in the temperature range where: the further splittings caused by adding more orbitals is negligible, and we have enough orbitals in the chain to account for splittings which are relevant in this temperature range. The results of this is that the results derived for a chain of any particular length are valid only in a particular temperature range, a range which moves to lower temperatures as the chain length increases. This means that by considering the results at many different chain lengths, one can build up a picture of the behavior of the system over a wide temperature range.

The Hamiltonian for a linear chain of finite length is an example of an effective Hamiltonian. It is not the full Hamiltonian of the infinite linear chain system, but in a certain temperature range it gives similar results to the full Hamiltonian.
