= Peter A. Wolff =

American physicist

Peter Adalbert Wolff
- Born: 15 November 1923
- Died: 5 September 2013 (aged 89)
- Education: UC Berkeley
- Known for: Schrieffer–Wolff transformation
- Scientific career
- Workplaces: Bell Telephone Laboratories; Massachusetts Institute of Technology; Princeton University
- Doctoral advisor: Robert Serber
- Notable students: Cynthia Roberta McIntyre

Peter Adalbert Wolff (November 15, 1923 – September 5, 2013) was an American physicist and Emeritus professor of the Massachusetts Institute of Technology, who worked in semiconductor research. He is known for the Schrieffer–Wolff transformation used to solve the Kondo model.

== Life ==
He earned his PhD in physics at UC Berkeley with Robert Serber as thesis advisor in 1951 and began his career at the Bell Telephone Laboratories the following year.

Wolff and John Robert Schrieffer developed the Schrieffer–Wolff transformation in 1966 to solve the Kondo model.

Thereafter Wolff joined the physics department of Massachusetts Institute of Technology (MIT) in 1970, becoming head of the condensed matter and atomic physics division. In the following years he hired Marc A. Kastner, John Joannopoulos and Robert J. Birgeneau. Together with P. M. Platzman, he coauthored the textbook Waves and Interactions in Solid State Plasmas in 1973.

In 1976 he moved on to the directorship of the Research Laboratory of Electronics and then of the Francis Bitter National Magnet Laboratory in 1981. Wolff left the director's chair in 1987 and retired from his faculty position in 1989 to become a fellow of the newly created NEC Research Institute at Princeton University. In 1994 he returned to MIT as the leader of the physics/industry forum for the physics department and remained a professor emeritus.

Wolff died of Alzheimer's disease in 2013.
