= Alexei Tsvelik =

Theoretical physicist

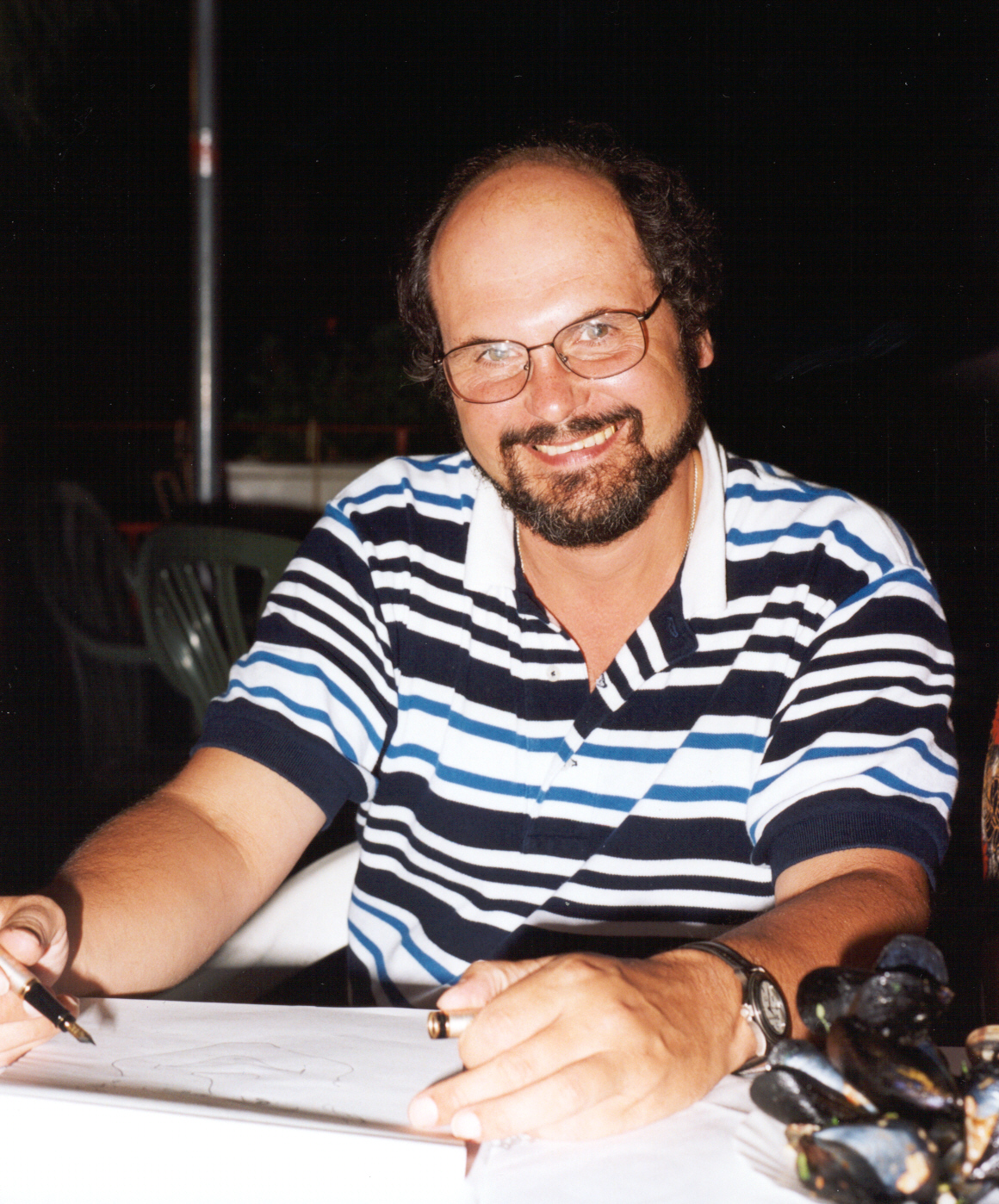
- Born: 23 March 1954; Kuybyshev (Samara)
- Education: Moscow Physical Technical Institute; Kurchatov Institute
- Known for: Exact solutions of quantum impurity models Kondo and Anderson models. Majorana fermion representation of spin-1 chain and two-leg spin-1/2 ladder Non-perturbative approaches to quasi-one dimensional strongly correlated electron systems
- Scientific career
- Fields: Condensed matter theory
- Workplaces: Brookhaven National Laboratory; Stony Brook
- Doctoral advisor: Aleksandr Fedorovich Barabanov

Alexei Mikhaylovich Tsvelik (Russian: Алексей Михайлович Цвелик; born 23 March 1954) is a theoretical condensed matter physicist working on strongly correlated electron systems. He is widely recognised for his pioneering contributions to the theory of low-dimensional systems, including applications of non-perturbative quantum field theory methods and the Bethe Ansatz.

== Education and Career ==
He graduated from the Moscow Physical Technical Institute in 1977, before gaining his PhD in Theoretical Physics in 1980 from the Kurchatov Institute for Atomic Energy. Between 1982 and 1989 he worked at the Landau Institute for Theoretical Physics. After visiting positions at Harvard, Princeton and the University of Florida, Tsvelik was appointed as a Lecturer, and subsequently Professor, at the University of Oxford (where he was affiliated to Brasenose College). In 2001 he was appointed as a Senior Physicist and Group Leader at Brookhaven National Laboratory. He has also served as an adjunct professor of physics at Stony Brook University.

== Research ==
Tsvelik has published more than 240 papers in refereed journals and is the author of two textbooks and several books on popular science.

Throughout his career, Tsvelik has significantly contributed to the application of quantum field-theoretical methods to the description of low-dimensional systems, focusing on methods of Integrability, Bosonization and Conformal Field Theory.

Early in his career, he became known for his works on exact solutions of quantum impurity models, including the multichannel Kondo model using the Bethe Ansatz with Paul Wiegmann. Their 1983 review on exact results on impurity models including Kondo and Anderson impurity models remains a landmark in the use of exact methods in quantum many-body systems.

The late 1980s and early 1990s witnessed a concerted experimental and theoretical effort to understand the physics of Haldane gap materials. Field-theoretical methods such as the Landau-Ginzburg approach for the $O(3)$ Non-linear sigma model for large-spin Heisenberg chains, and Tsvelik's Majorana fermion approach proved particularly useful for this purpose. Separately, Tsvelik also used Majorana fermions to model unusual magnetoresistance properties of high-Tc materials in collaboration with Piers Coleman and Andy Schofield.

Similar approaches proved useful in the understanding of spin ladder materials, of interest as simplified versions of high-Tc materials. As shown by Tsvelik in collaboration with Nersesyan and Shelton, a two-leg ladder has a simple low-energy representation in terms of four (weakly interacting) massive Majorana fermions, enabling the calculation of dynamical structure factors.

In a collaboration with John Tranquada and others he established the existence of a Berezinskii–Kosterlitz–Thouless transition in a three dimensional layered high-temperature superconducting material.

A recent notable contribution of Tsvelik provides clear pathways in the search for new states of matter in the form of chiral spin liquids.

== Awards and Recognitions ==
In 2002 Tsvelik was elected as a Fellow of the American Physical Society with citation For seminal contributions to quantum magnetism and for the exact solutions of important integrable models. He received a Brookhaven Science and Technology Award in 2006. In 2009 he was recognized as an Outstanding Referee by the American Physical Society. He was awarded a Alexander von Humboldt Research Award in 2014 and the Eugene Feenberg Memorial Medal in 2024 "for pioneering applications of quantum field theory to the understanding of emergent, many-body physics of quantum systems, in particular the physics of magnetic impurities, disordered systems, and Majorana representations of correlated problems".

== Hobbies ==
Tsvelik is a prolific caricaturist renowned among his colleagues for his blend of deference, humour and sarcasm. In particular, his textbooks contain many drawings of eminent physicists (a.k.a. "famous people nobody knows"). Alexei Tsvelik, in co-authorship with Alexey Burov, published a series of metaphysical articles "Pythagorean Argument of the Intelligent Design of the Universe and its Critique", in the Russian journal "Ideas and Ideals".
