= H. R. Krishnamurthy =

Indian theoretical physicist

Prof. H. R. Krishnamurthy
- Born: 1951 (age 74–75)
- Citizenship: India
- Education: Cornell University
- Known for: Numerical Renormalization Group, Anderson Impurity Model, High T_{c} Superconductors, Superfluidity, Ultracold Quantum Gases, Optical Lattices
- Awards: 1967 National Science Talent Search Scholarship; 1970 Karnataka state Award; 1973 IBM Graduate Fellowship; 1983 Science Academy Medal for Young Scientists; 2000 DAE-Raja Ramanna Prize; 1983 IISc Alumni Award for Excellence in Research for Science; 2006 J C Bose National Fellowship, Department of Science and Technology, Government of India; 2016 CNR Rao Vijnana Puraskara
- Scientific career
- Fields: Condensed matter physics
- Workplaces: Indian Institute of Science
- Doctoral advisor: Kenneth G. Wilson, John W. Wilkins
- Doctoral students: Madan Rao, Pinaki Majumdar, Tathagat Avatar Tulsi, Jaydeb Chakrabarti
- Website: http://www.physics.iisc.ac.in/~hrkrish/

Hulikal Ramaiengar Krishnamurthy (born 1951) is an Indian theoretical physicist. He specializes in theoretical condensed matter physics, especially quantum many-body theory and statistical physics. He was the chairman of the Department of Physics, Indian Institute of Science. His most well-known work is titled Renormalization Group Approach to the Anderson Model of Dilute Magnetic Alloys.

== Biography ==
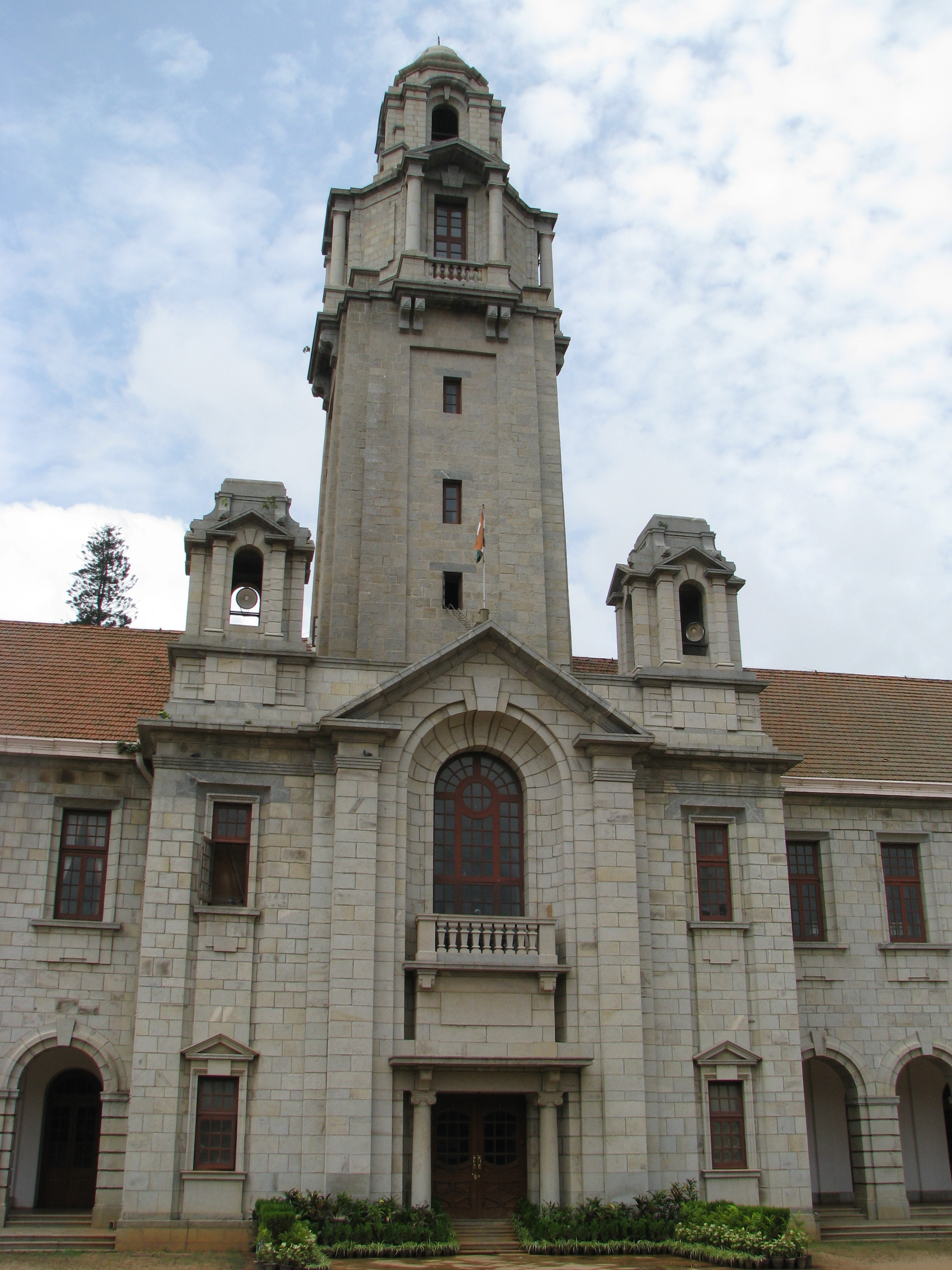
Indian Institute of Science

Krishnamurthy obtained his BSc (Hons) in Physics (1970) from Bangalore University and MSc (Physics) (1972) from IIT, Kanpur. He studied in Cornell University (1972–76) as an IBM fellow, working with Kenneth G. Wilson and John W. Wilkins. In his PhD thesis, he extended Wilson's numerical renormalization group solution for the Kondo problem to the symmetric Anderson impurity model. The extension to the asymmetric case was completed during his post-doctoral tenure (1976–78) at the University of Illinois. Krishnamurthy returned to India and joined the Department of Physics, IISc, Bangalore (1978) and became a Professor (1996). He has held sabbatical positions at Princeton University, Harvard University, Ohio State University, University of Cincinnati, UC Davis and Georgetown University.
