= Magnetic impurity =

Impurity in a host metal having a magnetic moment

A magnetic impurity is an impurity in a host metal that has a magnetic moment. The magnetic impurity can then interact with the conduction electrons of the metal, leading to interesting physics such as the Kondo effect, and heavy fermion behaviour. Some examples of magnetic impurities that metals can be doped with are iron and nickel. Such an impurity will contribute a Curie-Weiss term to the magnetic susceptibility,

$$\chi_{imp} = \frac{C}{T + \theta}$$.

Early theoretical work concentrated on explaining the trend observed as the impurity was varied across the transition metal group. Based on the idea of a virtual bound state, Anderson proposed a model that was successful in explaining the formation of a localized magnetic moment from a magnetic impurity.

== See also ==
- Anderson impurity model
- Anderson orthogonality theorem
- Magnetic semiconductors
