= Erio Tosatti =

Italian theoretical physicist

Erio Tosatti (born 9 November 1943 in Nonantola) is an Italian theoretical physicist active at the International School for Advanced Studies (SISSA), and at the Abdus Salam International Centre for Theoretical Physics (ICTP), both in Trieste, Italy. He is a broad-scope theorist who carried out research on a wide range of condensed matter physics phenomena. His early work dealt with optical properties, electron energy loss, theory of excitons and nonlocal dielectric response in solids, including layer crystals such as graphite and semiconductors; charge- and spin-density-waves; surface physics in all its aspects, particularly reconstruction, roughening and melting, also in clusters; the prediction the Berry phase in fullerene; the first calculated STM map of graphite, now a standard in the field; matter at extreme pressures: carbon, oxygen, hydrogen, CO_{2}, iron at earth core conditions, water and ammonia at deep planetary conditions, pressure-induced insulator-metal transitions in layer compounds like MoS2. In nanophysics, he and his group predicted helical structures of metal nanowires; the spontaneous magnetism of metal nanocontacts, including the electronic circumstances for normal or ferromagnetic Kondo effect therein. His and his collaborator's theory of strongly correlated superconductivity was recently confirmed in compounds such as Cs3C60. Pioneering papers on quantum annealing are now basic to current developments in quantum computing. More recently he moved on to the theory of nanofriction, a field where he obtained the ERC Advanced Grant MODPHYSFRICT 2013–2019, and subsequently, as co-PI with an experimental group, another ERC Advanced Grant ULTRADISS 2019-2024 . More details of his current and past research activity can be found here.

== Life ==
Born of a peasant family, he made it to the renowned Istituto tecnico industriale Fermo Corni high school of Modena, where his early subjects were technical and practical—electronics, nuclear technology, etc. Skills that allowed him to earn a living as a technician in a human physiology research laboratory while studying physics at the local Universita' di Modena. Associated from boyhood to Modena's renowned Societa' Corale Rossini directed by Livio Borri, a great music teacher, he sang for some years opera and church music within the choir which included among others the young Luciano Pavarotti.

His physics degree (Universita' di Modena 1967) was on pion-nucleon phase shift dispersion relations, a subject suggested by Daniele Amati. Admitted to doctoral studies in Pisa's famous Scuola Normale Superiore he switched to the burgeoning field of solid state physics in the freshly established research group of Franco G. Bassani working on the optical properties of semiconductors. His doctoral work (Scuola Normale Superiore, Pisa 1970) employed optical and electron energy loss data along with dispersion relations typical of high energy physics to work out the anisotropic dielectric tensor of graphite, later useful in the context of graphene.

After serving as a weather forecast under-lieutenant (GARF) for his (then compulsory) military service in the Italian Air Force, he moved to University of Rome—where he also collaborated with Ugo Fano—with a researcher position of Italy's National Research Council (CNR) . That position allowed him freedom to leave for a joint 18-month long Royal Society - NATO fellowship to the Cavendish Laboratory, at the University of Cambridge, UK, where in 1972-73 he collaborated with Philip W. Anderson. He also spent most of 1974 with a DFG fellowship at the University of Stuttgart in the group of Hermann Haken and most of 1977 at Stanford University, in the group of Sebastian Doniach .

From Rome he was called to Trieste in 1977 by Abdus Salam and Paolo Budinich to start within the International Centre for Theoretical Physics the ICTP Condensed Matter Theory Group, now flourishing. In 1980 he also became a professor at the newly established International School for Advanced Studies (SISSA), where he founded and directed for 27 years the Condensed Matter Theory group, and where he still works. From 1977 onwards his double involvement with SISSA and ICTP kept him in Trieste, with the exception of a sabbatical year at the IBM Zurich Research Laboratory where in 1984-85 he also collaborated with K. Alex Muller, as well as with Heinrich Rohrer and Gerd Binnig. His strong connection to the ICTP also brought him to serve as Director in 2002–2003.

== Honors ==
Tosatti was elected a Fellow of the American Physical Society in 2001, a corresponding member of the Accademia Nazionale dei Lincei in 2006, a foreign member of the U.S. National Academy of Sciences in 2011, a member of the Accademia Istituto Lombardo in 2012, a winner of the 2018 Enrico Fermi Prize of the Italian Physical Society, https://en.sif.it/activities/fermi_award and in 2019 a foreign member of the Chinese Academy of Sciences, the only Italian to be so honored.

For his research he had also been awarded the Burstein Lecture of the University of Pennsylvania in 1994, the Francesco Somaini Prize in 1997, and a vast number of invited colloquia and named lectures worldwide.

For his long-lasting efforts in favor of scientists in less fortunate countries he was awarded the 2005 AIP Tate Medal whose citation states that [Tosatti] "has probably left much deeper marks in many countries than most of the programs that make the headlines". For these merits the Spirit of Abdus Salam award was also bestowed upon him in August 2020.
