= Anderson model =

Anderson model may refer to:

- Anderson impurity model, used in physics to describe heavy fermion systems and Kondo insulators
- Anderson model of localization (Anderson localization), in condensed matter physics, the absence of diffusion of waves in a disordered medium
