= Samarium tetraboride =

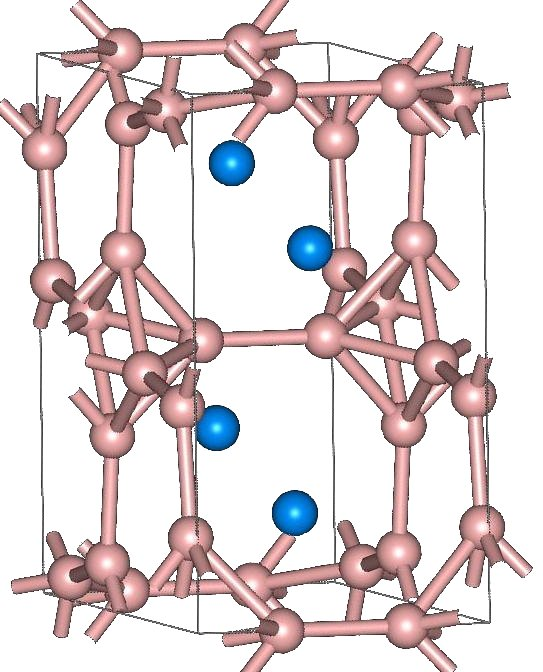

Names
- IUPAC name Samarium tetraboride

Identifiers
3D model (JSmol)	Interactive image
- InChI: InChI=1S/4B.Sm Key: IXWQBERMPYCDNG-UHFFFAOYSA-N
- SMILES: [Sm].[B].[B].[B].[B]

Properties
Chemical formula	SmB_{4}
Molar mass	193.60 g/mol
Density	6.1 g/cm^{3}
Melting point	2,400 °C (4,350 °F; 2,670 K)

Related compounds
Related compounds	Samarium hexaboride
- Except where otherwise noted, data are given for materials in their standard state (at 25 °C [77 °F], 100 kPa). Infobox references

Samarium tetraboride is a binary inorganic compound of samarium and boron with the formula SmB_{4}. It forms black crystals.

== Preparation ==
Samarium tetraboride can be prepared from directly reacting samarium and boron at 2400 °C:

Sm + 4B → SmB_{4}

== Physical properties ==
Samarium tetraboride forms crystals of the orthorhombic crystal system, space group P4/mbm, cell parameters a = 0.7174 nm, c = 0.40696 nm, Z = 4, and a structure like thorium tetraboride.

The compound is formed by a peritectic reaction at a temperature of 2400 °C.

At temperatures of 25 K and 7 K, magnetic transitions occur in the compound.
