= Jun Kondō =

Japanese physicist (1930–2022)

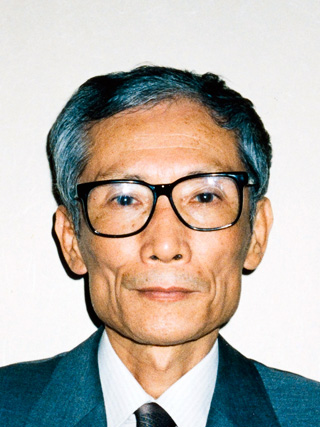
- Born: 6 February 1930; Tokyo, Japan
- Died: 11 March 2022 (aged 92)
- Education: University of Tokyo
- Organization(s): United States National Academy of Sciences; Japan Academy
- Known for: Kondo effect
- Awards: Imperial Prize of Japan Academy (1973); Order of Culture (2020)
- Scientific career
- Fields: Condensed matter physics

Jun Kondō (近藤 淳 Kondō Jun, 6 February 1930 – 11 March 2022) was a Japanese theoretical physicist.

His research is noted for the Kondo effect. He was an emeritus fellow of the National Institute of Advanced Industrial Science and Technology (AIST). Kondō died from pneumonia on 11 March 2022, at the age of 92.

== Honours and appointments ==
- 1959 Dr. of Science, University of Tokyo
- 1959 Research Associate, Nihon University
- 1960 Research Associate, Institute for Solid-State Physics, University of Tokyo
- 1963 Research Scientist, Electrotechnical Laboratory (ETL) [became AIST]
- 1968 Nishina Memorial Prize
- 1973 Imperial Prize of the Japan Academy
- 1979 Asahi Prize
- 1984 Fellow, ETL (dual appointment)
- 1987 Fritz London Memorial Prize
- 1990 Professor, Toho University
- 1995 Emeritus Professor, Toho University
- 1997 Member of the Japan Academy
- 2001–20??: Special Adviser, National Institute of Advanced Industrial Science and Technology (AIST)
- 2020 Order of Culture

== See also ==
- Kondo effect
- Kondo insulator
- Kondo model

== Books available in English ==
- Fermi surface effects: proceedings of the Tsukuba Institute, Tsukuba Science City, Japan, 27–29 August 1987 (1988)
- The Physics of Dilute Magnetic Alloys (Cambridge University Press, 2012) ISBN 978-1-107-02418-2
