= Dimitri Roditchev =

French physicist

Dimitri Roditchev is a French physicist of Russian-Ukrainian origin, specializing in electronic properties of nano-materials, superconductors, electron transport, and quantum tunneling phenomena. He is a professor at ESPCI ParisTech and a research director at CNRS (on leave from).

Laureate of Prix Louis Ancel. of French Physical Society (Société Française de Physique) in 2003 for his works on tunneling spectroscopy of high temperature superconductors, Dimitri Roditchev works in Laboratoire de Physique et d'Études des Matériaux (LPEM) where he is team leader of QuantumSpecs group, director of joint team QuEST between the laboratories LPEM-ESPCI and INSP-UPMC, and member of direction board of LPEM.

The research of Dimitri Roditchev at Moscow State University concerned studies of electronic properties of disordered metals and insulators, in relation with metal-insulator and superconductor-insulator phase transitions. In France since 1991, his activities include basic research (ultimately confined superconductivity, quantum vortex, proximity phenomena in hybrid systems, near-critical superconducting states, superconductivity of atomic layers at surfaces in relation with spin-orbit interaction, metal-insulator transition etc.) and engineering of high precision cryogenic equipment for scientific research.

The teaching activity of Dimitri Roditchev includes lectures in Condensed Matter Physics (both basic and advanced levels), advising personal research projects at l'ESPCI-Paris PSL. He is author of popular science articles and books, public conferences and interviews with the media.

== Selected bibliography ==
- Brun, C.; Cren, T.; Cherkez, V.; Debontridder, F.; Pons, S.; Fokin, D.; Tringides, M. C.; Bozhko, S.; Ioffe, L. B. (June 2014). "Remarkable effects of disorder on superconductivity of single atomic layers of lead on silicon". Nature Physics. 10 (6): 444–450. arXiv:1401.7876. Bibcode:2014NatPh..10..444B. doi:10.1038/nphys2937. ISSN 1745-2473. S2CID 119271787.
- Noat, Y.; Cherkez, V.; Brun, C.; Cren, T.; Carbillet, C.; Debontridder, F.; Ilin, K.; Siegel, M.; Semenov, A. (July 3, 2013). "Unconventional superconductivity in ultrathin superconducting NbN films studied by scanning tunneling spectroscopy". Physical Review B. 88 (1) 014503. Bibcode:2013PhRvB..88a4503N. doi:10.1103/PhysRevB.88.014503.
- Cren, Tristan; Fokin, Denis; Debontridder, François; Dubost, Vincent; Roditchev, Dimitri (March 27, 2009). "Ultimate Vortex Confinement Studied by Scanning Tunneling Spectroscopy". Physical Review Letters. 102 (12) 127005. Bibcode:2009PhRvL.102l7005C. doi:10.1103/PhysRevLett.102.127005. PMID 19392315.
- Cren, T.; Serrier-Garcia, L.; Debontridder, F.; Roditchev, D. (August 23, 2011). "Vortex Fusion and Giant Vortex States in Confined Superconducting Condensates". Physical Review Letters. 107 (9) 097202. Bibcode:2011PhRvL.107i7202C. doi:10.1103/PhysRevLett.107.097202. PMID 21929264.
- Roditchev, Dimitri; Brun, Christophe; Serrier-Garcia, Lise; Cuevas, Juan Carlos; Bessa, Vagner Henrique Loiola; Milošević, Milorad Vlado; Debontridder, François; Stolyarov, Vasily; Cren, Tristan (April 2015). "Direct observation of Josephson vortex cores". Nature Physics. 11 (4): 332–337. Bibcode:2015NatPh..11..332R. doi:10.1038/nphys3240. ISSN 1745-2473.
- Serrier-Garcia, L.; Cuevas, J. C.; Cren, T.; Brun, C.; Cherkez, V.; Debontridder, F.; Fokin, D.; Bergeret, F. S.; Roditchev, D. (April 9, 2013). "Scanning Tunneling Spectroscopy Study of the Proximity Effect in a Disordered Two-Dimensional Metal". Physical Review Letters. 110 (15) 157003. arXiv:1401.8102. Bibcode:2013PhRvL.110o7003S. doi:10.1103/PhysRevLett.110.157003. PMID 25167301. S2CID 21341881.
- Cherkez, V.; Cuevas, J. C.; Brun, C.; Cren, T.; Ménard, G.; Debontridder, F.; Stolyarov, V. S.; Roditchev, D. (March 11, 2014). "Proximity Effect between Two Superconductors Spatially Resolved by Scanning Tunneling Spectroscopy". Physical Review X. 4 (1) 011033. arXiv:1401.8118. Bibcode:2014PhRvX...4a1033C. doi:10.1103/PhysRevX.4.011033. S2CID 27509760.
