= Madan Rao =

Indian physicist (born 1960)

- Born: 11 July 1960 (age 66); India
- Education: IIT Bombay; Indian Institute of Science
- Known for: Studies on molecular dynamics on cell surface
- Awards: 1997 B. M. Birla Science Award; 2004 Shanti Swarup Bhatnagar Prize; 2016 IITB Distinguished Alumnus Award
- Scientific career
- Fields: Condensed matter physics; Biological physics
- Workplaces: Raman Research Institute; National Centre for Biological Sciences; International Centre for Theoretical Sciences
- Doctoral advisor: H. R. Krishnamurthy; Rahul Pandit; M. Wortis

Madan Rao (born 11 July 1960) is an Indian condensed matter and biological physicist and a senior professor at National Centre for Biological Sciences. Known for his research on molecular dynamics on cell surface, Rao is an elected fellow of the Indian Academy of Sciences and the Indian National Science Academy. The Council of Scientific and Industrial Research, the apex agency of the Government of India for scientific research, awarded him the Shanti Swarup Bhatnagar Prize for Science and Technology, one of the highest Indian science awards, for his contributions to physical sciences in 2004. (Note: Long link - please select award year to see details)

== Biography ==
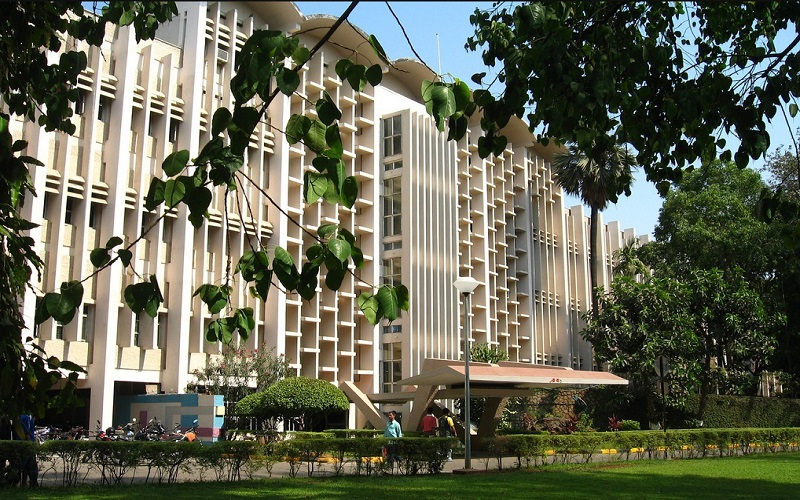
IIT Bombay

Born on 11 July 1960, Madan Rao did his master's studies at the Indian Institute of Technology, Bombay to earn an MSc in physics in 1982 and proceeded to do his doctoral studies on Hysteresis in Model Spin Systems at the Indian Institute of Science under the guidance of H. R. Krishnamurthy and Rahul Pandit, Both Shanti Swarup Bhatnagar laureates. After securing a PhD in 1988, he continued at IISc to do his post-doctoral work, mentored by M. Wortis, in the disciplines of membranes, soft matter and non-equilibrium statistical mechanics. Hr started his career as an associate professor at Raman Research Institute in 1989 and moved to the National Centre for Biological Sciences, a centre for advanced studies on biological research, when "Simon's Centre for the Study of Living Machines", then known as "Theory Group", was established there, where he holds the position of a senior professor. At NCBS, he works in close association with Satyajit Mayor, a biologist and a Shanti Swarup Bhatnagar laureate. He is also associated with the International Centre for Theoretical Sciences of Tata Institute of Fundamental Research as an associate faculty.

Rao lives in Bengaluru, in the south Indian state of Karnataka.

== Legacy ==
At NCBS, Rao worked on non-equilibrium properties of membranes and martensitic transformation and is known to have made significant contributions in providing a wider understanding of chirality-induced budding and dynamics of intracellular trafficking. Molecular dynamics at cell surface, membrane dynamics, golgi and mitochondrial morphogenesis, chromatin organization, soft active matter physics and biomolecular dynamics are some of the other areas he has worked on. His studies have been documented by way of a number of articles (Note: Please see Selected bibliography section) and the online article repository of the Indian Academy of Sciences has listed 33 of them. He was also a member of the organizing committee of the Conference on Frontiers in Materials Modelling and Design held in Kalpakkam in 1996.

== Awards and honors ==
B. M. Birla Science Centre awarded Rao their annual B. M. Birla Science Prize in 1997 and he received the Swarnajayanti Fellowship of the Department of Science and Technology in 1998. The Council of Scientific and Industrial Research awarded him the Shanti Swarup Bhatnagar Prize, one of the highest Indian science awards in 2004. During 2007–11, he received two research fellowships; Human Frontier Science Program (HFSP) Grant (2007) as well as the Indo-French Centre for the Promotion of Advanced Research (CEFIPRA) Grant. The Indian Academy of Sciences elected him as a fellow in 2011 and his alma mater, the Indian Institute of Technology, Mumbai chose his as a Distinguished Alumnus in 2016. He received the elected fellowship of the Indian National Science Academy in 2017.

== Selected bibliography ==
- R. C. Sarasij, Madan Rao (2001). "Active fusion and fission processes on a fluid membrane". Physical Review Letters. 87 (12) 128101. arXiv:cond-mat/0009167. Bibcode:2001PhRvL..87l8101R. doi:10.1103/PhysRevLett.87.128101. PMID 11580560. S2CID 18505500.
- V. S. Gayathri, Madan Rao (2007). "Fluctuation-induced chiral symmetry breaking in autocatalytic reaction-diffusion systems". EPL. 80 (2) 28001. arXiv:cond-mat/0503176. Bibcode:2007EL.....8028001G. doi:10.1209/0295-5075/80/28001. S2CID 119079593.
- Madan Rao, H. R. Krishnamurthy (2009). "Hysteresis in model spin system". Journal of Applied Physics. 67 (9): 5451–5453. Bibcode:1990JAP....67.5451R. doi:10.1063/1.345840.

== See also ==
- Chromatin
- Diffusionless transformation
