= Hill limit (solid-state) =

In solid-state physics, the Hill limit is a critical distance defined in a lattice of actinide or rare-earth atoms. These atoms own partially filled $4f$ or $5f$ levels in their valence shell and are therefore responsible for the main interaction between each atom and its environment. In this context, the hill limit $r_H$ is defined as twice the radius of the $f$-orbital. Therefore, if two atoms of the lattice are separate by a distance greater than the Hill limit, the overlap of their $f$-orbital becomes negligible. A direct consequence is the absence of hopping for the f electrons, ie their localization on the ion sites of the lattice.

Localized f electrons lead to paramagnetic materials since the remaining unpaired spins are stuck in their orbitals. However, when the rare-earth lattice (or a single atom) is embedded in a metallic one (intermetallic compound), interactions with the conduction band allow the f electrons to move through the lattice even for interatomic distances above the Hill limit.

== See also ==
- Anderson impurity model
