= Anderson orthogonality theorem =

Theorem in physics

The Anderson orthogonality theorem is a theorem in physics by the physicist P. W. Anderson.

It relates to the introduction of a magnetic impurity in a metal. When a magnetic impurity is introduced into a metal, the conduction electrons will tend to screen the potential $V(r)$ that the impurity creates. The N-electron ground state for the system when $V(r) = 0$, which corresponds to the absence of the impurity and $V(r) \neq 0$, which corresponds to the introduction of the impurity are orthogonal in the thermodynamic limit $N \to \infty$.
