= Anderson's theorem (superconductivity) =

Theorem about disorder and superconductivity

In the field of superconductivity, Anderson's theorem states that superconductivity in a conventional superconductor is robust with respect to (non-magnetic) disorder in the host material. It is named after P. W. Anderson, who discussed this phenomenon in 1959, briefly after BCS theory was introduced.

One consequence of Anderson's theorem is that the critical temperature T_{c} of a conventional superconductor barely depends on material purity, or more generally on defects. This concept breaks down in the case of very strong disorder, e.g. close to a superconductor-insulator transition. Also, it does not apply to unconventional superconductors. In fact, strong suppression of T_{c} with increasing defect scattering, thus non-validity of Anderson's theorem, is taken as a strong indication for superconductivity being unconventional.
