= Schrieffer–Wolff transformation =

Unitary transformation in quantum mechanics

In quantum mechanics, the Schrieffer–Wolff transformation is a unitary transformation used to determine an effective (often low-energy) Hamiltonian by decoupling weakly interacting subspaces. Using a perturbative approach, the transformation can be constructed such that the interaction between the two subspaces vanishes up to the desired order in the perturbation. The transformation also perturbatively diagonalizes the system Hamiltonian to first order in the interaction. In this, the Schrieffer–Wolff transformation is an operator version of second-order perturbation theory. The Schrieffer–Wolff transformation is often used to project out the high energy excitations of a given quantum many-body Hamiltonian in order to obtain an effective low energy model. The Schrieffer–Wolff transformation thus provides a controlled perturbative way to study the strong coupling regime of quantum-many body Hamiltonians.

Although commonly attributed to the paper in which the Kondo model was obtained from the Anderson impurity model by John Robert Schrieffer and Peter A. Wolff in 1966., Joaquin Mazdak Luttinger and Walter Kohn used this method in an earlier work about non-periodic k·p perturbation theory. Using the Schrieffer–Wolff transformation, the high-energy charge excitations present in Anderson impurity model are projected out and a low energy effective Hamiltonian is obtained which has only virtual charge fluctuations. For the Anderson impurity model case, the Schrieffer–Wolff transformation showed that the Kondo model lies in the strong coupling regime of the Anderson impurity model.

== Derivation ==
Consider a quantum system evolving under the time-independent Hamiltonian operator $H$ of the form:
$$H = H_0 + V$$
where $H_0$ is a Hamiltonian with known eigenstates $|m\rangle$ and corresponding eigenvalues $E_m$, and where $V$ is a small perturbation. Moreover, it is assumed without loss of generality that $V$ is purely off-diagonal in the eigenbasis of $H_0$, i.e., $\langle m | V |m\rangle = 0$ for all $m$. Indeed, this situation can always be arranged by absorbing the diagonal elements of $V$ into $H_0$, thus modifying its eigenvalues to $E'_m = E_m + \langle m|V| m\rangle$.

The Schrieffer–Wolff transformation is a unitary transformation which expresses the Hamiltonian in a basis (the "dressed" basis) where it is diagonal to first order in the perturbation $V$. This unitary transformation is conventionally written as:
$$H' = e^{S} H e^{-S}$$
When $V$ is small, the generator $S$ of the transformation will likewise be small. The transformation can then be expanded in $S$ using the Baker–Campbell–Hausdorff formula
$$H' = H + [S,H] + \frac{1}{2}[S,[S,H]]+ \dots$$
Here, $[A,B]$ is the commutator between operators $A$ and $B$. In terms of $H_0$ and $V$, the transformation becomes
$$H' = H_0 + V + [S,H_0] + [S,V] + \frac{1}{2}[S,[S,H_0]] + \frac{1}{2}[S,[S,V]] + \dots$$
The Hamiltonian can be made diagonal to first order in $V$ by choosing the generator $S$ such that
$$V + [S, H_0] = 0$$
This equation always has a definite solution under the assumption that $V$ is off-diagonal in the eigenbasis of $H_0$. Substituting this choice in the previous transformation yields:
$$H' = H_0 + \frac{1}{2}[S,V] + O(V^3)$$
This expression is the standard form of the Schrieffer–Wolff transformation. Note that all the operators on the right-hand side are now expressed in a new basis "dressed" by the interaction $V$ to first order.

In the general case, the difficult step of the transformation is to find an explicit expression for the generator $S$. Once this is done, it is straightforward to compute the Schrieffer-Wolff Hamiltonian by computing the commutator $[S,V]$. The Hamiltonian can then be projected on any subspace of interest to obtain an effective projected Hamiltonian for that subspace. In order for the transformation to be accurate, the eliminated subspaces must be energetically well separated from the subspace of interest, meaning that the strength of the interaction $V$ must be much smaller than the energy difference between the subspaces. This is the same regime of validity as in standard second-order perturbation theory.

== Particular case ==
This section will illustrate how to practically compute the Schrieffer-Wolff (SW) transformation in the particular case of an unperturbed Hamiltonian that is block-diagonal.

But first, to properly compute anything, it is important to understand what is actually happening during the whole procedure. The SW transformation $W=e^S$ being unitary, it does not change the amount of information or the complexity of the Hamiltonian. The resulting shuffle of the matrix elements creates, however, a hierarchy in the information (e.g. eigenvalues), that can be used afterward for a projection in the relevant sector. In addition, when the off-diagonal elements coupling the blocks are much smaller than the typical unperturbed energy scales, a perturbative expansion is allowed to simplify the problem.

Consider now, for concreteness, the full Hamiltonian $H=H_0+V$ with an unperturbed part $H_0$ made of independent blocks $H_0^i$. In physics, and in the original motivation for the SW transformation, it is desired that each block corresponds to a distinct energy scale. In particular, all degenerate energy levels should belong to the same block. This well-split Hamiltonian is our starting point $H_0$. A perturbative coupling $V$ takes now on a specific meaning: the typical matrix element coupling different sectors must be much smaller than the eigenvalue differences between those sectors. The SW transformation will modify each block $H_0^i$ into an effective Hamiltonian $H_{\text{eff}}^i$ incorporating ("integrating out") the effects of the other blocks via the perturbation $V$. In the end, it is sufficient to look at the sector of interest (called a projection) and to work with the chosen effective Hamiltonian to compute, for instance, eigenvalues and eigenvectors. In physics, this would generate effective low- (or high-)energy Hamiltonians.

As mentioned in the previous section, the difficult step is the computation of the generator $S$ of the SW transformation. To obtain results comparable to second-order perturbation theory, it is enough to solve the equation $[H_0,S]=V$ (see Derivation). A simple trick in two steps is available when $H_0$ is block-diagonal.

The first step consists of finding the unitary transformation $U$ diagonalizing $H_0$. Since each block $H_0^i$ can be diagonalized with a unitary transformation $U^i$ (this is the matrix of right-eigenvectors of $H_0^i$), it is enough to build $U=\operatorname{diag}(U^i)$, composed of the smaller rotations $U^i$ on its diagonal, to transform $H_0$ into a purely diagonal matrix $D_0=\operatorname{diag}(d_i)$.

The application of $U$ to the whole matrix $H$ yields then
$$H_D=U^{-1}HU= D_0 + V'$$
with a transformed perturbation $V'=U^{-1}VU$, which remains off-diagonal. In this new form, the second step to compute $S$ becomes very simple, since we obtain an explicit expression, in components:
$$S_{ij}=\frac{V'_{ij}}{d_i-d_j}$$
where $d_i$ denotes the $i$th element on the diagonal of $D_0$. The reason for this comes from the observation that, for any matrix $A=(A_{ij})$, and diagonal matrix $D=\operatorname{diag}(d_i)$, we have the relation $[D,A]_{ij}=(d_i-d_j)A_{ij}$. Since the generator for $H_D$ is defined by $[D_0,S]=V'$, the above formula follows immediately. As expected, the associated operator $W=e^{S}$ is unitary (it satisfies $W^\dagger=W^{-1}$) because the denominator of $S$ changes sign when transposed, and $V$ is Hermitian.

Using the last formula in the derivation, the second-order Schrieffer-Wolff-transformed Hamiltonian $H'=e^{S}H_D e^{-S}$ has now an explicit form as a function of its elementary terms $D_0$ and $V'$:
$$H'_{ij} = d_i \delta_{ij} + \frac{1}{2} \sum_k V'_{ik} V'_{kj} \left( \frac{1}{d_i-d_k} + \frac{1}{d_j-d_k} \right) + O(V'^{3})$$

The "dressed" states have an energy
$$E'_n = d_n + \sum_k \frac{V'_{nk} V'_{kn}}{d_n-d_k} + O(V'^{3})$$
following the recipe for first-order (non-degenerate) perturbation theory. This is applicable since the SW transformation is based on the approximation $|V_{ij}|\ll |d_i-d_j|$ Note that the unitary rotation $U$ does not affect the eigenvalues, meaning that $E'_n$ is also a meaningful approximation for the original Hamiltonian $H$.

The "dressed" states themselves can be derived, in first-order perturbation theory too, as
$$\psi'_{n} = \psi_{R,n} + \frac{1}{2}\sum_{k\neq n}\sum_j \psi_{R,k} V'_{kj} V'_{jn} \frac{ d_k + d_n-2 d_j}{(d_n-d_j)(d_k-d_j)(d_n-d_k)}$$
Notice the index $R$ to the unperturbed eigenstate $\psi_R$ of $D_0$ to recall the current rotated basis of $H_D$. To express the eigenstates in the natural basis $\psi$ of $H$ itself, it is necessary to perform the unitary transformation $\psi_R \to U^{-1}\psi$.
