= Pinaki Majumdar =

Indian condensed matter physicist (b. 1964)

Prof. Pinaki Majumdar
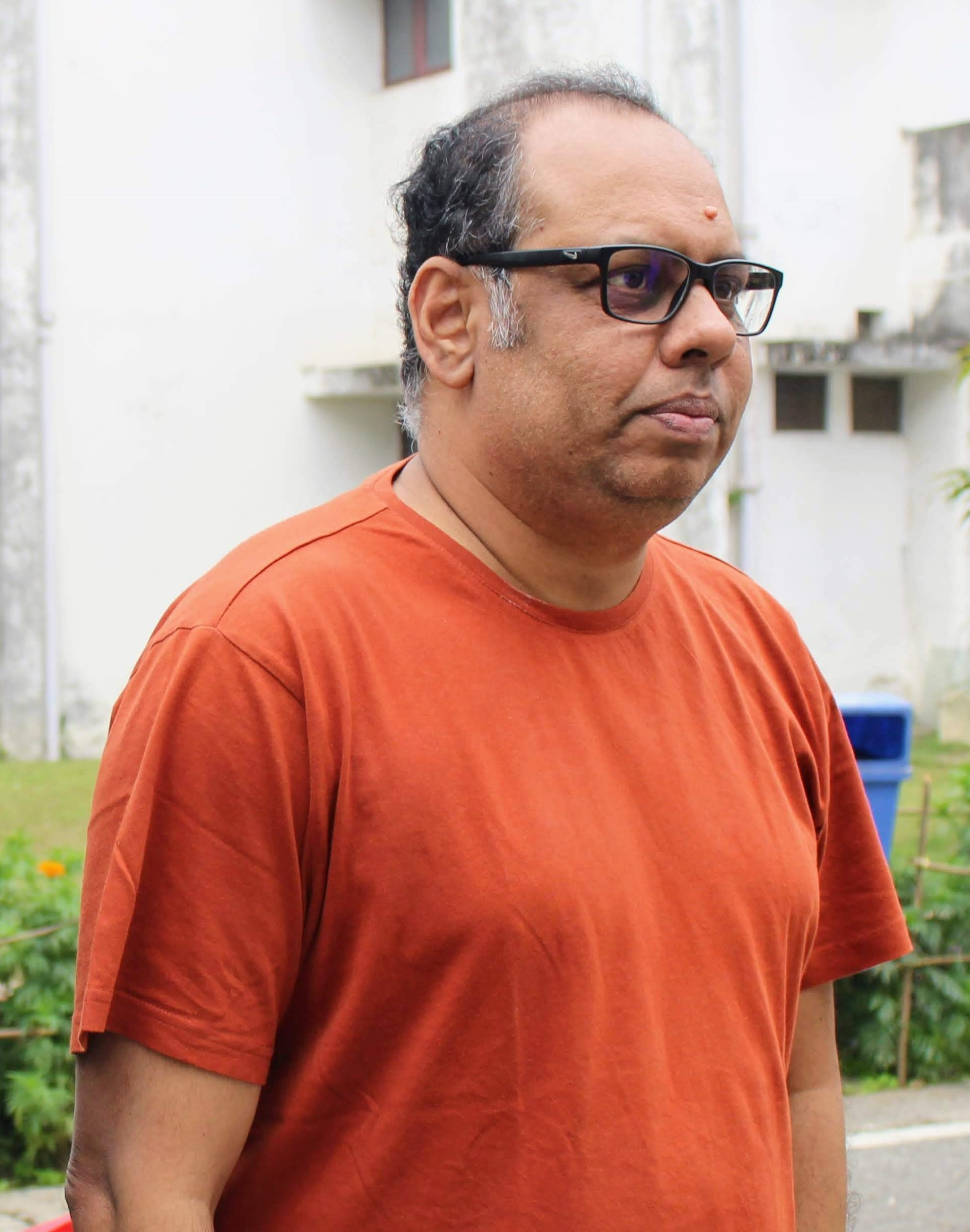
- Born: 26 January 1964 (age 62); Calcutta, West Bengal, India
- Citizenship: India
- Education: Jadavpur University; IIT Madras; Indian Institute of Science; Bell Laboratories
- Known for: Studies on metal-insulator transition, High T_{c} Superconductors, Superfluidity, Ultracold Quantum Gases, Optical Lattices and nanoscale texture formation
- Spouse: Gargee Majumdar
- Children: Parananda Majumdar
- Awards: 1990 IITM Merit Prize; 2007 Shanti Swarup Bhatnagar Prize; 2008 Global Indus Technovator Award; 2008 DAE-SRC Outstanding Research Investigator Award
- Scientific career
- Fields: Condensed matter physics
- Workplaces: Harish-Chandra Research Institute
- Doctoral advisor: H. R. Krishnamurthy
- Other academic advisors: Peter Littlewood
- Doctoral students: Anamitra Mukherjee
- Website: http://www.hri.res.in/~pinaki/

Pinaki Majumdar (born 26 January 1964) is an Indian condensed matter physicist and the director of the Harish-Chandra Research Institute. Known for his research on correlated quantum systems, Majumdar is a recipient of the Global Indus Technovator Award of the Massachusetts Institute of Technology. The Council of Scientific and Industrial Research, the apex agency of the Government of India for scientific research, awarded him the Shanti Swarup Bhatnagar Prize for Science and Technology, one of the highest Indian science awards, for his contributions to physical sciences in 2007. (Note: Long link - please select award year to see details)

== Biography ==
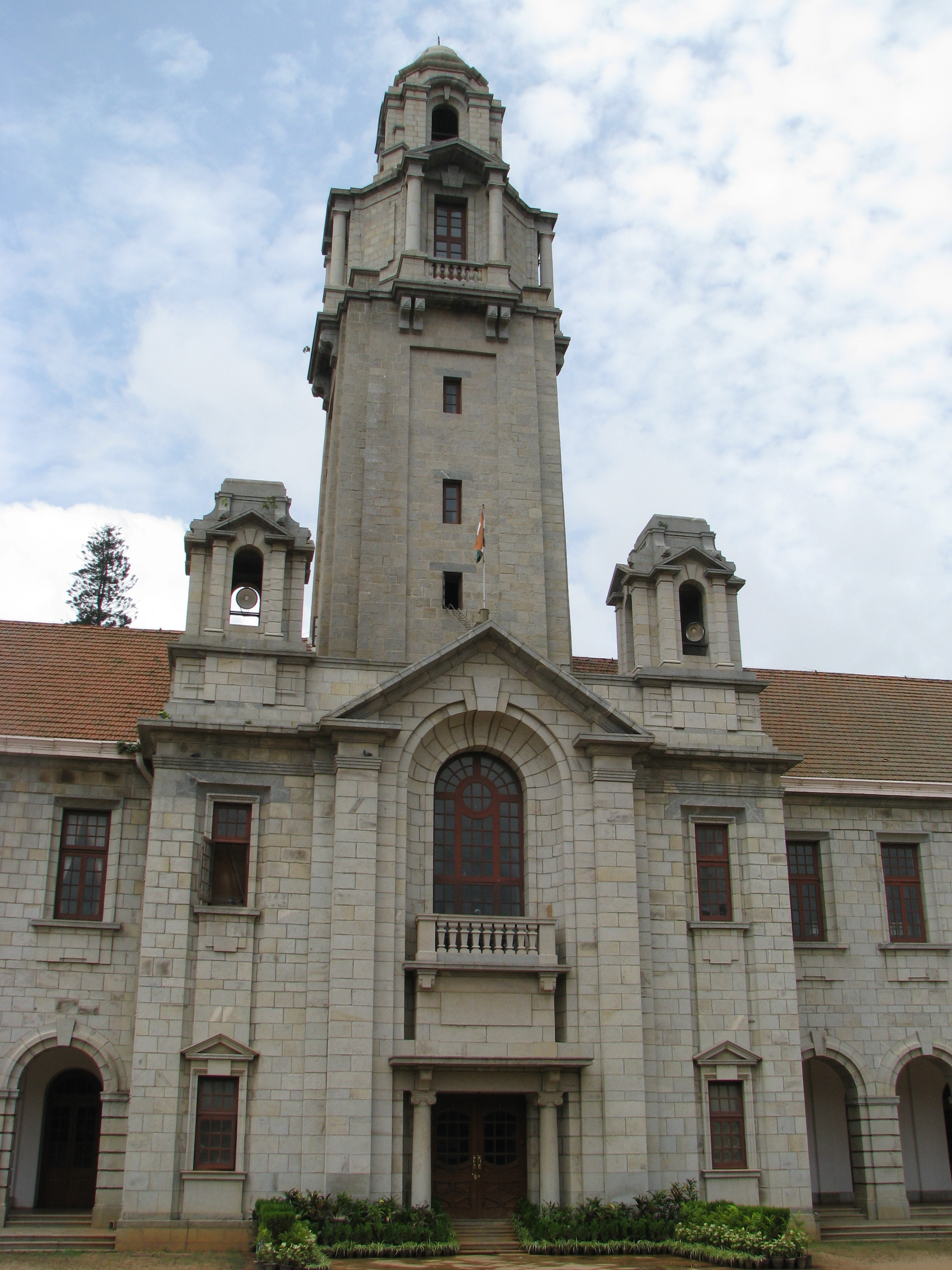
Indian Institute of Science

Born on 26 January 1964 in West Bengal, Pinaki Majumdar graduated in engineering from Jadavpur University in 1986 and continued his studies at the Indian Institute of Technology, Madras from where he earned a master's degree (MTech) in 1990. His doctoral studies were at the Indian Institute of Science and after earning a PhD in 1996, he did his post-doctoral work at Bell Laboratories, New Jersey for a couple of years. Returning to India, he joined Harish-Chandra Research Institute as a fellow in 1998. He has since held various positions at HRI such as those of a reader (2001–03) and an associate professor (2003–07) before becoming a full professor in 2007. He continues his association with the institute, holding the positions of the director and grade-1 professor. He also serves as a professor at Homi Bhabha National Institute.

== Legacy and honors ==
Majumdar's research was mainly focused on disordered and strongly correlated quantum systems and his studies have assisted in a wider understanding of the metal-insulator transition. He is also reported to have contributed to the studies of nanoscale texture formation and colossal response driven by external fields. His studies have been documented by way of a number of articles (Note: Please see Selected bibliography section) and Google Scholar, an online article repository of scientific articles, has listed 93 of them.

Majumdar won the Institute Merit Prize and Silver Medal of the Indian Institute of Technology, Madras in 1990 when he passed out of the institute. The Council of Scientific and Industrial Research awarded Pinaki the Shanti Swarup Bhatnagar Prize, one of the highest Indian science awards in 2007. He received two awards in 2008; the Outstanding Research Investigator Award of the Safety Review Committee of the Department of Atomic Energy (DAE-SRC and the Global Indus Technovator Award of Massachusetts Institute of Technology.

== Selected bibliography ==
- Pinaki Majumdar, H. R. Krishnamurthy (1995). "Lattice Contraction Driven Insulator-Metal Transition in the d=∞ Local Approximation". Phys. Rev. Lett. 74 (3303): 1525–1528. Bibcode:1994PhRvL..73.1525M. doi:10.1103/PhysRevLett.73.1525. PMID 10056815.
- Pinaki Majumdar, Peter B. Littlewood (1998). "Dependence of magnetoresistivity on charge-carrier density in metallic ferromagnets and doped magnetic semiconductors". Nature. 395 (6701): 479–481. Bibcode:1998Natur.395..479M. doi:10.1038/26703. S2CID 204997491.
- Sumathi Rao (editor); Pinkai Majumdar (chapter author) (30 May 2002). "Quantum Many Particle Physics". Field Theories in Condensed Matter Physics. CRC Press. pp. 7–. ISBN 978-0-7503-0876-2.

== See also ==
- Quantum systems
