= Cynthia Roberta McIntyre =

Theoretical physicist

Cynthia R. McIntyre
- Born: 1960 (age 65–66); San Antonio, Texas
- Education: Massachusetts Institute of Technology
- Scientific career
- Fields: theoretical physics
- Thesis: "New models of magnetic interactions for bound magnetic polarons in dilute magnetic semiconductors" (1990)
- Doctoral advisor: Peter A. Wolff

Dr. Cynthia R. McIntyre (born 1960) is a theoretical physicist and former Senior Vice President at the Council on Competitiveness. Her research focuses on the electronic and optical properties of semiconductor heterostructures. She was the second Black woman to receive a PhD in physics from the Massachusetts Institute of Technology.

== Biography ==
McIntyre was born in 1960 and grew up in San Antonio, Texas as the only child of two school teachers. She received her PhD in physics from the Massachusetts Institute of Technology in 1990. Her research focus is condensed matter physics, and she completed a dissertation "New models of magnetic interactions for bound magnetic polarons in dilute magnetic semiconductors" advised by Peter A. Wolff. When she was a graduate student, McIntyre co-founded the National Conference of Black Physics Students and organized the first NCBPS conference. For this work, she became one of the first recipients of the MIT's Dr. Martin Luther King Jr. Leadership Award in 1995. She continues to be involved in this organization.

McIntyre then went on to serve as the Commonwealth Professor of Physics at George Mason University.

== Career ==
- Chief of Staff to the President of Rensselaer Polytechnic Institute from 1999–2007.
- Governing Board of the American Physical Society (1998-2000).
- Board of Trustees for Spelman College (2003-2009).
- External Advisory Committee of the National High Magnetic Field Laboratory, Florida State University (2005 to present).
- National Research Council Research Associateship. Conducted research on low-dimensional semiconductor systems at the Naval Research Laboratory in Washington, D.C.
- Postdoctoral Fellow, University of California at San Diego
- Senior Vice President at the Council on Competitiveness
  - She contributed to the development of policies aiding the use of high-performance computing (HPC) in the private sector for economic and competitive gains.

== Awards ==
1. HPCWire's People to Watch in 2013.
2. MIT's Dr. Martin Luther King Jr. Leadership Award in 1995.
