= Kondo model =

Model for physics of semiconductors

The Kondo model (sometimes referred to as the s-d model) is a model for a single localized quantum impurity coupled to a large reservoir of delocalized and noninteracting electrons. The quantum impurity is represented by a spin-1/2 particle, and is coupled to a continuous band of noninteracting electrons by an antiferromagnetic exchange coupling $J$. The Kondo model is used as a model for metals containing magnetic impurities, as well as quantum dot systems.

== Kondo Hamiltonian ==
The Kondo Hamiltonian is given by

$$H = \sum_{k\sigma} \epsilon_{\mathbf{k}} c^{\dagger}_{\mathbf{k}\sigma}c_{\mathbf{k}\sigma} - J \mathbf{S}\cdot \mathbf{s}$$

where $\mathbf{S}$ is the spin-1/2 operator representing the impurity, and

$$\mathbf{s} = \sum_{k,k',\sigma,\sigma'} c^{\dagger}_{\mathbf{k}\sigma} \mathbf{\sigma}_{\sigma,\sigma'}c_{\mathbf{k'}\sigma'}$$

is the local spin-density of the noninteracting band at the impurity site ($\mathbf{\sigma}$ are the Pauli matrices). In the Kondo problem, $J < 0$, i.e. the exchange coupling is antiferromagnetic.

== History ==
Jun Kondo applied third-order perturbation theory to the Kondo model and showed that the resistivity of the model diverges logarithmically as the temperature goes to zero. He explained why metal samples containing magnetic impurities have a resistance minimum (see Kondo effect). The problem of finding a solution to the Kondo model which did not contain this unphysical divergence became known as the Kondo problem.

A number of methods were used to attempt to solve the Kondo problem. Phillip W. Anderson devised a perturbative renormalization group method, known as poor man's scaling, which involves perturbatively eliminating excitations to the edges of the noninteracting band. This method indicated that, as temperature is decreased, the effective coupling between the spin and the band, $J_{\mathrm{eff}}$, increases without limit. As this method is perturbative in J, it becomes invalid when J becomes large, so this method did not truly solve the Kondo problem, although it did hint at the way forward.

The Kondo problem was finally solved when Kenneth G. Wilson applied the numerical renormalization group to the Kondo model and showed that the resistivity goes to a constant as temperature goes to zero.

The Kondo model is intimately related to the Anderson impurity model, as can be shown by Schrieffer–Wolff transformation.

== Variants ==
There are many variants of the Kondo model. For instance, the spin-1/2 can be replaced by a spin-1 or even a greater spin. The two-channel Kondo model is a variant of the Kondo model which has the spin-1/2 coupled to two independent noninteracting bands. All these models have been solved by Bethe ansatz. One can also consider the ferromagnetic Kondo model (i.e. the standard Kondo model with J > 0).

== See also ==
- Anderson impurity model
- Kondo effect
