= Rahul Pandit =

Indian physicist (born 1956)

- Born: 22 April 1956 (age 70); New Delhi, India
- Education: 1972–77 IIT Delhi; 1977–82 University of Illinois; 1982–83 Cornell University
- Known for: Studies on phase transitions and spatiotemporal chaos and turbulence
- Awards: 1988 INSA Young Scientist Medal; 2001 Shanti Swarup Bhatnagar Prize; 2004 UGC Meghnad Saha Award; 2009 IISc Professor Rustom Choksi Award; 2010 IITD Distinguished Alumni Award
- Scientific career
- Fields: Condensed matter physics
- Workplaces: 1984– Indian Institute of Science; 2002–08 ICTS; 2013– JNCASR-honorary; 1986–93 Ohio State University-visiting; 1995–96 University of Missouri-visiting; ASICTP-visiting; 2001 Côte d'Azur Observatory-visiting; 2014 École Normale Supérieure-visiting
- Doctoral advisor: Michael Wortis

Rahul Pandit (born 22 April 1956) is an Indian condensed matter physicist, a professor of physics and a divisional chair at the Indian Institute of Science. Known for his research on phase transitions and spatiotemporal chaos and turbulence, Pandit is an elected fellow of the Indian Academy of Sciences, Indian National Science Academy and The World Academy of Sciences. The Council of Scientific and Industrial Research, the apex agency of the Government of India for scientific research, awarded him the Shanti Swarup Bhatnagar Prize for Science and Technology, one of the highest Indian science awards, for his contributions to physical sciences in 2001. (Note: Long link - please select award year to see details)

== Biography ==
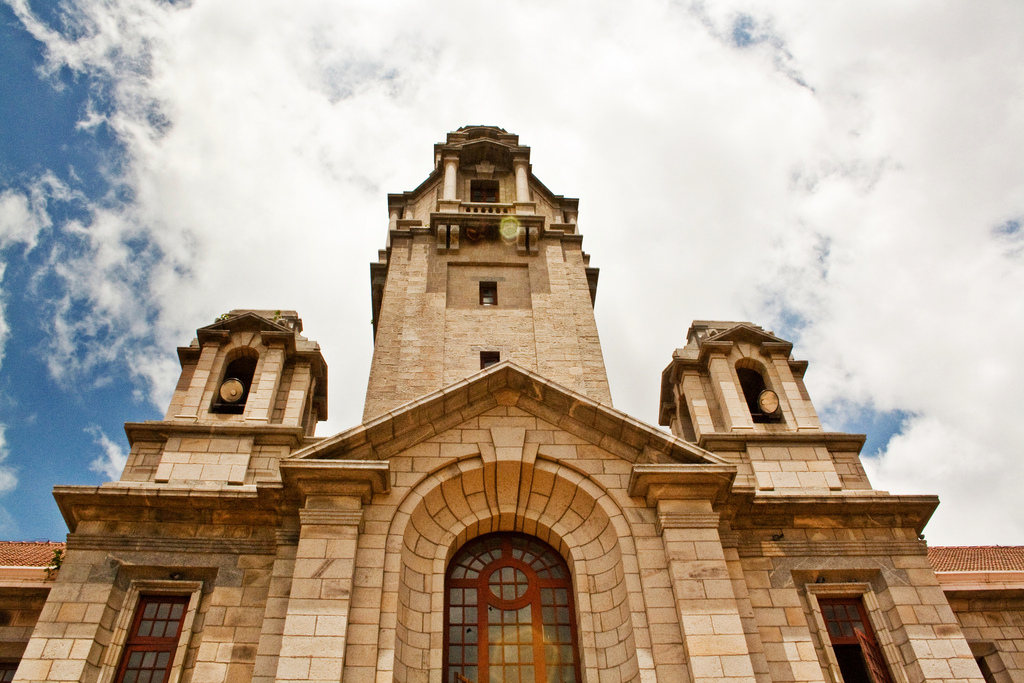
Indian Institute of Science

Rahul Pandit was born on 22 April 1956 in the Indian capital of New Delhi. After early schooling, he did his under-graduate studies as a National Talent Search scholar at the Indian Institute of Technology, Delhi and continued there to earn an MS in physics in 1977. Subsequently, he moved to the US and obtained a second master's degree in physics in 1979 from the University of Illinois at Urbana-Champaign. His doctoral studies under the guidance of Michael Wortis were also at the same institution, to secure a PhD in 1982. After completing his post-doctoral studies at Cornell University in 1983, he returned to India to join the Indian Institute of Science as a research associate in 1984.

Pandit has been serving out his career at IISc ever since. He has held several positions at the institute such as those of a research scientist (1985–90), assistant professor (1990–96) and associate professor (1996–2002) until he became a professor in 2002, a position he holds until date along with the chair of the Division of Physical and Mathematical Sciences of the institute. In between, he chaired the International Relations Cell of IISc and the Theoretical Sciences Unit of Jawaharlal Nehru Centre for Advanced Scientific Research (JNCASR) during 2002–08 and served as a member of the Condensed Matter Theory Unit of JNCASR until 2012. A three-year stint as an adjunct professor at the International Centre for Theoretical Sciences of Tata Institute of Fundamental Research during 2009–12 was another position he has held. His current responsibilities include the MSIL Chair Professorship of IISc and Honorary Professorship of JNCASR. He has also been a visiting professor at various institutions such as Ohio State University, University of Missouri, Abdus Salam International Centre for Theoretical Physics, Côte d'Azur Observatory and École Normale Supérieure.

== Legacy ==
Wetting of different fluids: A shows a fluid with very little wetting, while C shows a fluid with more wetting. A has a large contact angle, and C has a small contact angle

Pandit has been focusing his work on the problems related to phase transitions, statistical mechanics and non-linear dynamics, Kuramoto-Sivashinsky equation and Complex-Ginzburg-Landau equations. His contributions reportedly include theoretical elucidation of multilayer-adsorption and wetting phenomena on attractive substrates and the scaling properties of quasiperiodic Schroedinger operators. He is known to have developed a a theory of hysteresis loops in model spin systems and a cardiac arrhythmias model and his studies have assisted in a wider understanding of low-amplitude defibrillation schemes and cardiac arrhythmias. Glass formation in soft condensed matter systems, interacting bosons, colossal magnetoresistance manganites and complex fluids have been some of his other interests. His studies have been documented by way of a number of articles (Note: Please see Selected bibliography section) and the online article repository of the Indian Academy of Sciences has listed 79 of them. Besides, he has mentored 15 research scholars in their doctoral studies.

Pandit was involved, in the capacity of the secretary of the organizing committee, in the organization of STATPHYS 22 the international statistical physics conference of the International Union of Pure and Applied Physics held at the IISc campus in 2004. He is the secretary of the C3 Commission on Statistical Physics of the International Union for Pure and Applied Physics and has held the chair of IUPAP national committee in India. He is a former divisional associate editor of Physical Review Letters journal (2004–10) and a former member of the editorial advisory board of Physica A: Statistical Mechanics and its Applications of Elsevier (2001–07). He is a member of the divisional committee of the Innovation in Science Pursuit for Inspired Research (INSPIRE) program of the Department of Science and Technology and sits on the editorial board of Cambridge IISc Series, a publishing collaboration between the Indian Institute of Science and Cambridge University Press India. He has delivered invited speeches at various conferences including the International Symposium on Fluid Days held in December 2007–January 2008.

== Awards and honors ==
Pandit, who was a National Talent Search scholar during his early college days (1972–77), stood first in his Physics for his graduate examination in 1977. While at the University of Illinois at Urbana-Champaign, he held the Exxon Fellowship and on his return to India, he was a Young Associate of the Indian Academy of Sciences. He received the Young Scientist Medal of the Indian National Science Academy in 1988. The Council of Scientific and Industrial Research awarded him the Shanti Swarup Bhatnagar Prize, one of the highest Indian science awards in 2001. He was selected for the Meghnad Saha Award by the University Grants Commission in 2004 and the Indian Institute of Science chose him for the Professor Rustom Choksi Award. His alma mater, IIT Delhi selected him as the Distinguished Alumunus in 2010.

Pandit, a member of Phi Kappa Phi and Sigma Xi, was elected as a fellow of the Indian Academy of Sciences in 1996. A decade later, the Indian National Science Academy elected him as their fellow and he became an elected fellow of The World Academy of Sciences in 2015. American Physical Society awarded him Outstanding Referee citation to him in 2012 for his work on Physical Review and Physical Review Letters journals. The award orations delivered by him include 2007 DAE Raja Ramanna Award Lecture on The mathematical modelling of cardiac arrhythmias of Jawaharlal Nehru Centre for Advanced Scientific Research. He has also been holding J. C. Bose National Fellowship of the Department of Science and Technology since 2007. He is a 2025 Fellow of the American Physical Society.

== Selected bibliography ==
=== Books ===
- S. Dattagupta, H.R. Krishnamurthy, R. Pandit, T.V. Ramakrishnan, D. Sen (Editors) (2005). Proceedings of the 22nd IUPAP International Conference on Statistical Physics (STATPHYS 22). International Union of Pure and Applied Physics.

=== Chapters ===
- M Lal; R A Mashelkar, B D Kulkarni, V M Naik (Editors); Aswin Pande, Rahul Pandit (chapter authors) (1 October 1999). "Spatiotemporal Chaos in a Model or Co Oxidation on Pt(110)". Structure and Dynamics of Materials in the Mesoscopic Domain. World Scientific. pp. 94–. ISBN 978-1-78326-350-9.

=== Articles ===
- Samriddhi Sankar Ray; Dhrubaditya Mitra; Rahul Pandit (2008). "The universality of dynamic multiscaling in homogeneous, isotropic Navier-stokes and passive-scalar turbulence". New Journal of Physics. 10 (3) 033003. Bibcode:2008NJPh...10c3003S. doi:10.1088/1367-2630/10/3/033003.
- Prasad Perlekar; Rahul Pandit (2009). "Statistically steady turbulence in thin films: direct numerical simulations with Ekman friction". New Journal of Physics. 11 (7) 073003. Bibcode:2009NJPh...11g3003P. doi:10.1088/1367-2630/11/7/073003.
- Prasad Perlekar; Rahul Pandit (2010). "Turbulence-induced melting of a nonequilibrium vortex crystal in a forced thin fluid film". New Journal of Physics. 12 (2) 023033. arXiv:0910.3096. Bibcode:2010NJPh...12b3033P. doi:10.1088/1367-2630/12/2/023033. S2CID 26611984.
- Prasad Perlekar; Samriddhi Sankar Ray; Dhrubaditya Mitra; Rahul Pandit (2011). "Persistence problem in two-dimensional fluid turbulence". Physical Review Letters. 106 (5) 054501. arXiv:1009.1494. Bibcode:2011PhRvL.106e4501P. doi:10.1103/PhysRevLett.106.054501. PMID 21405401. S2CID 33997946.
- J. M. Kurdestany; R. V. Pai; R. Pandit (2012). "The inhomogeneous extended Bose-Hubbard model: a mean-field theory". Annalen der Physik. 524 (3–4): 234–244. arXiv:1201.6451. Bibcode:2012AnP...524..234K. doi:10.1002/andp.201100274. S2CID 118596810.

== See also ==
- Chaos theory
