= John Robert Schrieffer =

American physicist (1931–2019)

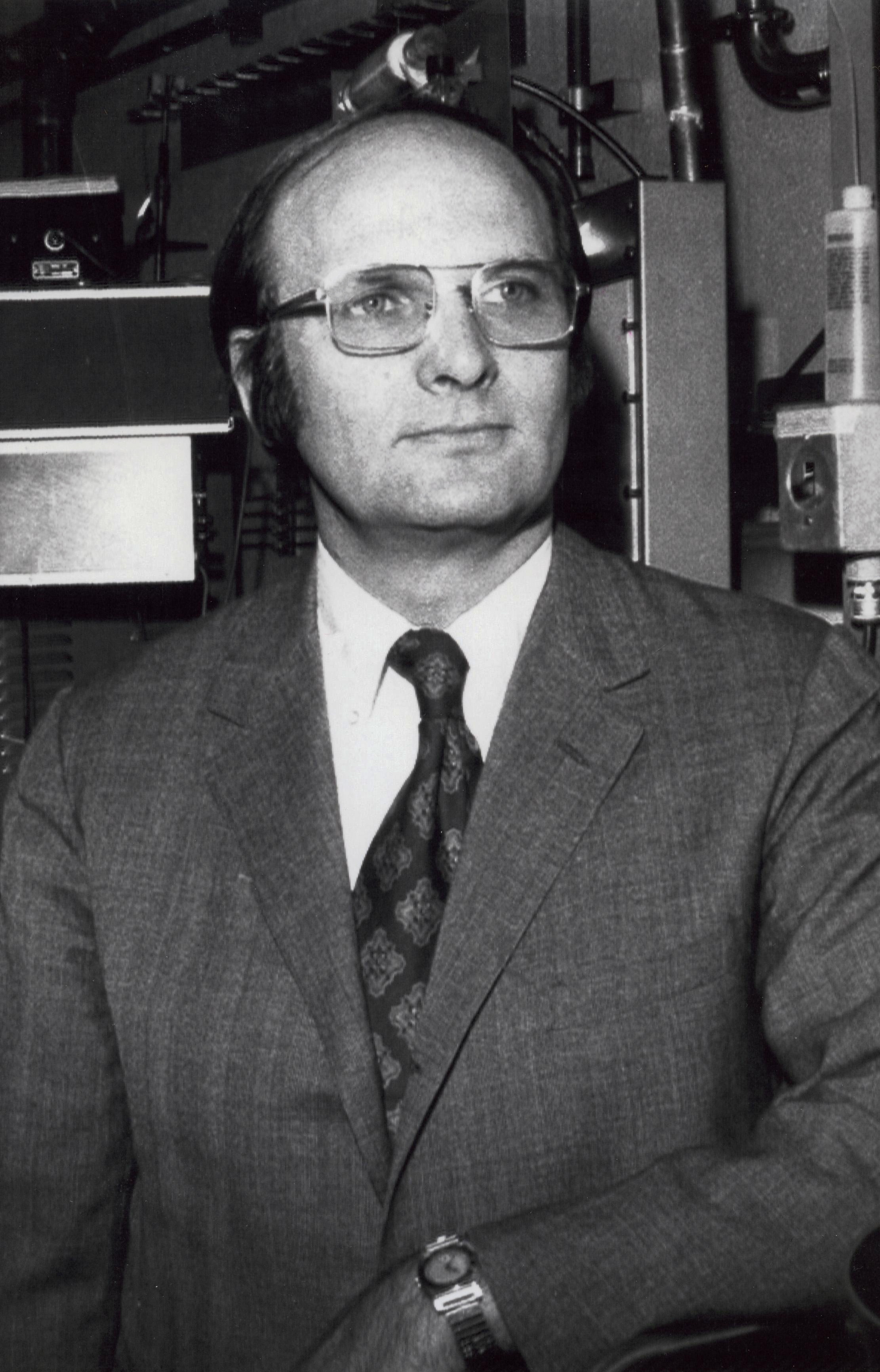
- Schrieffer in 1972
- Born: May 31, 1931; Oak Park, Illinois, U.S.
- Died: July 27, 2019 (aged 88); Tallahassee, Florida, U.S.
- Education: MIT (B.S. 1953); University of Illinois at Urbanna-Champaign (PhD 1957)
- Known for: BCS theory; SSH model; Schrieffer–Wolff transformation; Paramagnons
- Spouse: Anne Grete Thomsen (m. 1960)
- Children: 3
- Awards: Comstock Prize in Physics (1968); Oliver E. Buckley Prize (1968); Nobel Prize in Physics (1972); National Medal of Science (1983)
- Scientific career
- Fields: Physics
- Workplaces: University of Pennsylvania; University of California, Santa Barbara; Florida State University
- Thesis: The theory of superconductivity (1957)
- Doctoral advisor: John Bardeen

John Robert Schrieffer (/ˈʃriːfər/ SHREE-fer; May 31, 1931 – July 27, 2019) was an American theoretical physicist who received the 1972 Nobel Prize in Physics along with John Bardeen and Leon Cooper for developing the BCS theory, the first successful quantum description of superconductivity.

== Early life and education ==
John Robert Schrieffer was born on May 31, 1931, in Oak Park, Illinois, the son of Louise (née Anderson) and John Henry Schrieffer. His family moved in 1940 to Manhasset, New York, and then in 1947 to Eustis, Florida, where his father, a former pharmaceutical salesman, began a career in the citrus industry. In his Florida days, Schrieffer enjoyed playing with homemade rockets and ham radio, a hobby that sparked an interest in electrical engineering.

After graduating from Eustis High School in 1949, Schrieffer was admitted to the Massachusetts Institute of Technology (MIT), where for two years he majored in electrical engineering before switching to physics in his junior year. He completed a bachelor's thesis on multiplets in heavy atoms under the direction of John C. Slater in 1953. Pursuing his interest in condensed-matter physics, Schrieffer began graduate studies at the University of Illinois, where he was hired immediately as a research assistant to John Bardeen. After working out a theoretical problem of electrical conduction on semiconductor surfaces, Schrieffer spent a year in the laboratory, applying the theory to several surface problems. In his third year of graduate studies, he joined Bardeen and Leon Cooper in developing the theory of superconductivity.

== Research and career ==
Schrieffer recalled that in January 1957 he was on a subway train in New York City when he had an idea of how to describe mathematically the ground state of superconducting electrons. Schrieffer and Bardeen's collaborator Cooper had discovered that electrons in a superconductor are grouped in pairs, now called Cooper pairs, and that the motions of all Cooper pairs within a single superconductor are correlated and function as a single entity due to phonon-electron interactions. Schrieffer's mathematical breakthrough was to describe the behavior of all Cooper pairs at the same time, instead of each individual pair. The day after returning to Illinois, Schrieffer showed his equations to Bardeen, who immediately realized they were the solution to the problem. The Bardeen–Cooper–Schrieffer or BCS theory of superconductivity, as it is now known, accounted for more than 30 years of experimental results that had stymied some of the greatest theorists in physics.

After completing his doctoral thesis on the theory of superconductivity, Schrieffer spent the 1957–1958 academic year as a National Science Foundation fellow at the University of Birmingham in England and at the Niels Bohr Institute in Denmark, where he continued research into superconductivity. Following a year as an assistant professor at the University of Chicago, he returned to the University of Illinois in 1959 as a faculty member. In 1960, he went back to the Bohr Institute for a summer visit, during which he became engaged to Anne Grete Thomsen, whom he married at Christmas of that year. They had three children, Bolette, Paul, and Regina. Two years later, Schrieffer joined the faculty of the University of Pennsylvania in Philadelphia. In 1964, Schrieffer published his book on the BCS theory, Theory of Superconductivity.

In 1980, Schrieffer became a professor at the University of California, Santa Barbara, and rose to chancellor professor in 1984, serving as director of the university's Kavli Institute for Theoretical Physics. In 1992, Florida State University appointed Schrieffer as a university eminent scholar professor and chief scientist of the National High Magnetic Field Laboratory, where he continued to pursue one of the great goals in physics: room temperature superconductivity.

== Later life and death ==
On September 24, 2004, while driving with a suspended license, Schrieffer was involved in an automobile accident that killed one person and injured seven others. Schrieffer was said to have fallen asleep at the wheel of his car. On November 6, 2005, he was sentenced to two years in prison for vehicular manslaughter. Schrieffer was incarcerated in Richard J. Donovan Correctional Facility at Rock Mountain near San Diego, California.

Schrieffer died on July 27, 2019, at a nursing facility in Florida while sleeping. He was 88 years old. He was a Christian.

== Recognition ==
=== Awards ===
| Year | Organization | Award | Co-recipients | Citation | Ref. |
|---|---|---|---|---|---|
| 1968 | National Academy of Sciences | Comstock Prize in Physics | Leon Cooper | — | |
| 1968 | American Physical Society | Oliver E. Buckley Prize | — | "For his contributions to many-body theory and its application to the interpretation of experiments, especially in the field of superconductivity." | |
| 1972 | Swedish Academy of Sciences | Nobel Prize in Physics | John Bardeen and Leon Cooper | "For their jointly developed theory of superconductivity, usually called the BCS-theory." | |
| 1983 | National Science Foundation | National Medal of Science | — | "In recognition of his insight into cooperative effects in solids and solid surfaces dependent on interacting many-body systems and for his leadership in showing how one couples formal theoretical work with experimental findings to make significant advances in the area of condensed matter physics." | |

=== Memberships ===
| Year | Organization | Type | Ref. |
|---|---|---|---|
| 1970 | American Academy of Arts and Sciences | Member | |
| 1971 | National Academy of Sciences | Member | |
| 1975 | American Philosophical Society | Member | |

== See also ==
- List of Nobel laureates affiliated with the University of California, Santa Barbara
