= Superconductor–insulator transition =

Type of quantum phase transition

The superconductor–insulator transition is an example of a quantum phase transition, whereupon tuning some parameter in the Hamiltonian, a dramatic change in the behavior of the electrons occurs. The nature of how this transition occurs is disputed, and many studies seek to understand how the order parameter, $\Psi =\Delta \exp(i\theta)$, changes. Here $\Delta$ is the amplitude of the order parameter, and $\theta$ is the phase. Most theories involve either the destruction of the amplitude of the order parameter - by a reduction in the density of states at the Fermi surface, or by destruction of the phase coherence; which results from the proliferation of vortices.

== Destruction of superconductivity ==
In two dimensions, the subject of superconductivity becomes very interesting because the existence of true long-range order is not possible. In the 1970s, J. Michael Kosterlitz and David J. Thouless (along with Vadim Berezinski) showed that a different kind of long-range order could exist - topological order - which showed power law correlations (meaning that by measuring the two-point correlation function $\langle\Psi(0)\Psi(r)\rangle\propto r^{-\gamma}$ it decays algebraically).

This picture changes if disorder is included. Kosterlitz-Thouless behavior can be obtained, but the fluctuations of the order parameter are greatly enhanced, and the transition temperature is suppressed.

The model to keep in mind in the understanding of how superconductivity occurs in a two-dimensional disordered superconductor is the following. At high temperatures, the system is in the normal state. As the system is cooled towards its transition temperature, superconducting grains begin to fluctuate in and out of existence. When one of these grains "pops" into existence, it is accelerated without dissipation for a time $\tau$ before decaying back into the normal state. This has the effect of increasing the conductivity even before the system has condensed into the superconducting state. This increased conductivity above $T_{c0}$ is referred to as paraconductivity, or fluctuation conductivity, and was first correctly described by Lev G. Aslamazov and Anatoly Larkin. As the system is cooled further, the lifetime of these fluctuations increase, and becomes comparable to the Ginzburg-Landau time

$$\tau_{\mathrm{GL}}=\frac{\pi\hbar}{8k_{\mathrm B}(T_{\mathrm c0}-T)}$$.

Eventually, the amplitude $\Delta$ of the order parameter becomes well defined (it is non-zero wherever there are superconducting patches), and it can begin to support phase fluctuations. These phase fluctuations set in at a lower temperature, and are caused by vortices - which are topological defects in the order parameter. It is the motion of vortices that gives rise to inflation of resistance below $T_{\mathrm c0}$. Eventually the system is cooled further, below the Kosterlitz-Thouless temperature $T_{\mathrm c}$, all of the free vortices become bound into vortex-antivortex pairs, and the systems attains a state with zero resistance.

== Finite magnetic field ==
Cooling the system to $T=0$ and turning on a magnetic field has certain effects. For very small fields ($B < B_{c1}$) the magnetic field is shielded from the interior of the sample. Above $B_{c1}$ however, the energy cost to keep out the external field becomes too great, and the superconductor allows the field to penetrate in quantized fluxons. Now the superconductor has transitioned into the "mixed state", in which there is a superfluid along with vortices - which now have only one circulation.

Increasing the field adds vortices to the system. Eventually the density of vortices becomes so large that they overlap. The core of the vortex contains normal electrons (i.e. the amplitude of the superconducting order parameter is zero), so when they overlap, superconductivity is killed by destroying the amplitude of the order parameter. Increasing the field further leads to a very interesting possibility - in two-dimensions where the fluctuations are enhanced - that the vortices may condense into a Bose-condensate, which localizes the superconducting pairs.

== Intermediate metallic phase and superinsulation ==
In 1996, Diamantini, Sodano and Trugenberger proposed a quantum phase diagram for planar Josephson-junction arrays containing superconducting and superinsulating phases, with an intermediate metallic phase possible in a range of parameters. Their gauge-theory description incorporates the coupling between charges and vortices. The intermediate phase was subsequently discussed as a Bose metal, also called an anomalous metal.

Experimental evidence for an intermediate metallic regime was reported in Josephson-junction arrays by van der Zant, Elion, Geerligs and Mooij in 1996, the same year as the theoretical proposal. Further evidence for the bosonic nature of an intermediate metallic state was obtained by Yang and collaborators in 2019. In nanopatterned superconducting films, they observed low-temperature resistance saturation together with magnetoconductance oscillations having a period corresponding to charge-2e carriers.

In 2005, Sambandamurthy, Engel, Johansson, Peled and Shahar reported an abrupt disappearance of differential conductance below a well-defined temperature and a finite threshold for conduction in amorphous indium oxide films. They described the phenomenon as a "collective insulating state". These observations preceded the explicit identification of superinsulation in titanium nitride films by Vinokur, Baturina and collaborators in 2008, who reported experimental evidence for a transition to a superinsulating state and described its duality with superconductivity.

== Quantum phase fluctuations ==
Experimental studies have examined the role of quantum phase fluctuations beyond descriptions based solely on classical thermal fluctuations. In a 2026 preprint, Weitzel and collaborators reported that the zero-temperature superfluid stiffness decreases rapidly towards zero near the superconductor–insulator transition, while the mean-field transition temperature remains finite. They attributed this behaviour to quantum phase fluctuations driving the zero-temperature transition, while finding that the finite-temperature transition retains its Berezinskii–Kosterlitz–Thouless character.

In another 2026 preprint, Bishop-Van Horn and collaborators reported measurements of local superfluid phase stiffness in gate-tunable Josephson-junction arrays that were inconsistent with a classical XY description using standard junction models. They interpreted their results as evidence that quantum fluctuations suppress superconductivity and enhance spatial inhomogeneity near the superconductor–insulator transition, where anomalous metallic transport emerges.

== See also ==
- Metal–insulator transition
- Anderson's theorem
