= Kondo effect =

Physical phenomenon due to impurities

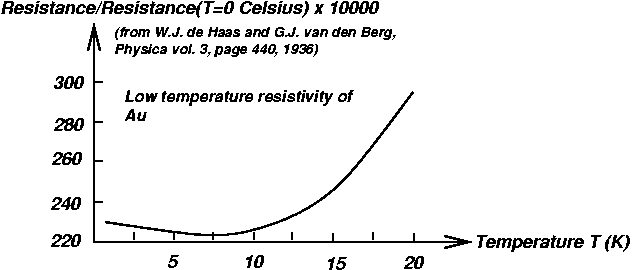
Kondo effect: How the resistivity of gold behaves at low temperatures, when there is a small amount of what were probably iron impurities.

In physics, the Kondo effect describes the scattering of conduction electrons in a metal due to magnetic impurities, resulting in a characteristic change i.e. a minimum in electrical resistivity with temperature. The cause of the effect was first explained by Jun Kondo, who applied third-order perturbation theory to the problem to account for scattering of s-orbital conduction electrons off d-orbital electrons localized at impurities (Kondo model). Kondo's calculation predicted that the scattering rate and the resulting part of the resistivity should increase logarithmically as the temperature approaches 0 K. Extended to a lattice of magnetic impurities, the Kondo effect likely explains the formation of heavy fermions and Kondo insulators in intermetallic compounds, especially those involving rare earth elements such as cerium, praseodymium, and ytterbium, and actinide elements such as uranium. The Kondo effect has also been observed in quantum dot systems.

== Theory ==
The dependence of the resistivity $\rho$ on temperature $T$, including the Kondo effect, is written as

$$\rho(T) = \rho_0 + aT^2 + c_m \ln\frac{\mu}{T} + bT^5,$$

where $\rho_0$ is the residual resistivity, the term $aT^2$ shows the contribution from the Fermi liquid properties, and the term $bT^5$ is from the lattice vibrations: $a$, $b$, $c_m$ and $\mu$ are constants independent of temperature. Jun Kondo derived the third term with logarithmic dependence on temperature and the experimentally observed concentration dependence.

== History ==
In 1930, Walther Meissner and B. Voigt observed that the resistivity of nominally pure gold reaches a minimum at 10 K, and similarly for nominally pure Cu at 2 K. Similar results were discovered in other metals. Kondo described the three puzzling aspects that frustrated previous researchers who tried to explain the effect:

- The resistivity of a truly pure metal is expected to decrease monotonically, because with lower temperature, the probability of electron-phonon scattering decreases.
- The resistivity should rapidly plateau when the temperature drops below the Debye temperature of the phonons, corresponding with the highest allowed mode of vibration of the metal. However, in the AuFe alloy, the resistivity continues to rise sharply below 0.01 K, yet there seemed to be no energy gap in AuFe alloy that small.
- The phenomenon is universal, so any explanation should apply in general.

Experiments in the 1960s by Myriam Sarachik at Bell Laboratories showed the phenomenon was caused by magnetic impurity in nominally pure metals. When Kondo sent a preview of his paper to Sarachik, Sarachik confirmed the data fit the theory.

Kondo's solution was derived using perturbation theory resulting in a divergence as the temperature approaches 0 K. Later methods using non-perturbative techniques refined his result. These improvements produced a finite resistivity, but retained the feature of a resistance minimum at a non-zero temperature. One defines the Kondo temperature as the energy scale limiting the validity of the perturbation results. The Anderson impurity model and accompanying Wilsonian renormalization theory were an important contribution to understanding the underlying physics of the problem. Based on the Schrieffer–Wolff transformation, it was shown that the Kondo model lies in the strong coupling regime of the Anderson impurity model. The Schrieffer–Wolff transformation eliminates the high-energy charge excitations from the Anderson impurity model, obtaining the Kondo model as an effective Hamiltonian.

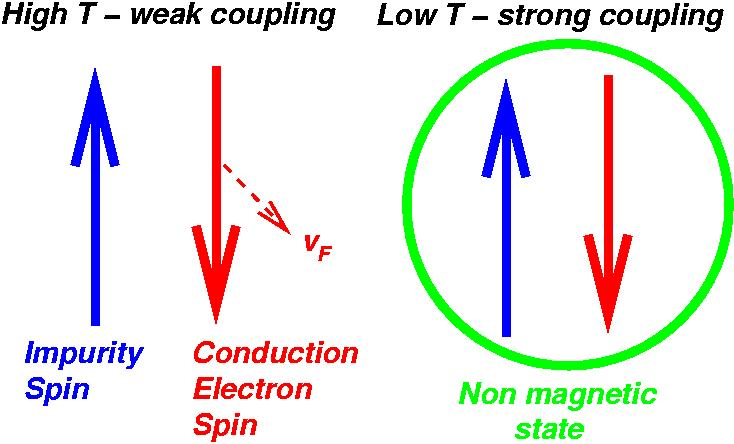
Schematic of the weakly coupled high temperature situation in which the magnetic moments of conduction electrons in the metal host pass by the impurity magnetic moment at speeds of v_{F}, the Fermi velocity, experiencing only a mild antiferromagnetic correlation in the vicinity of the impurity. In contrast, as the temperature tends to zero the impurity magnetic moment and one conduction electron moment bind very strongly to form an overall non-magnetic state.

The Kondo effect can be considered as an example of asymptotic freedom, i.e. a situation where the coupling becomes non-perturbatively strong at low temperatures and low energies. In the Kondo problem, the coupling refers to the interaction between the localized magnetic impurities and the itinerant electrons.

== Examples ==
Extended to a lattice of magnetic ions, the Kondo effect likely explains the formation of heavy fermions and Kondo insulators in intermetallic compounds, especially those involving rare earth elements such as cerium, praseodymium, and ytterbium, and actinide elements such as uranium. In heavy fermion materials, the non-perturbative growth of the interaction leads to quasi-electrons with masses up to thousands of times the free electron mass, i.e., the electrons are dramatically slowed by the interactions. In a number of instances they are superconductors. It is believed that a manifestation of the Kondo effect is necessary for understanding the unusual metallic delta-phase of plutonium.

The Kondo effect has been observed in quantum dot systems. In such systems, a quantum dot with at least one unpaired electron behaves as a magnetic impurity, and when the dot is coupled to a metallic conduction band, the conduction electrons can scatter off the dot. This is completely analogous to the more traditional case of a magnetic impurity in a metal.

Band-structure hybridization and flat band topology in Kondo insulators have been imaged in angle-resolved photoemission spectroscopy experiments.

In 2012, Beri and Cooper proposed a topological Kondo effect could be found with Majorana fermions, while it has been shown that quantum simulations with ultracold atoms may also demonstrate the effect.

In 2017, teams from the Vienna University of Technology and Rice University conducted experiments into the development of new materials made from the metals cerium, bismuth and palladium in specific combinations and theoretical work experimenting with models of such structures, respectively. The results of the experiments were published in December 2017 and, together with the theoretical work, lead to the discovery of a new state, a correlation-driven Weyl semimetal. The team dubbed this new quantum material Weyl-Kondo semimetal.
