= Samarium hexaboride =

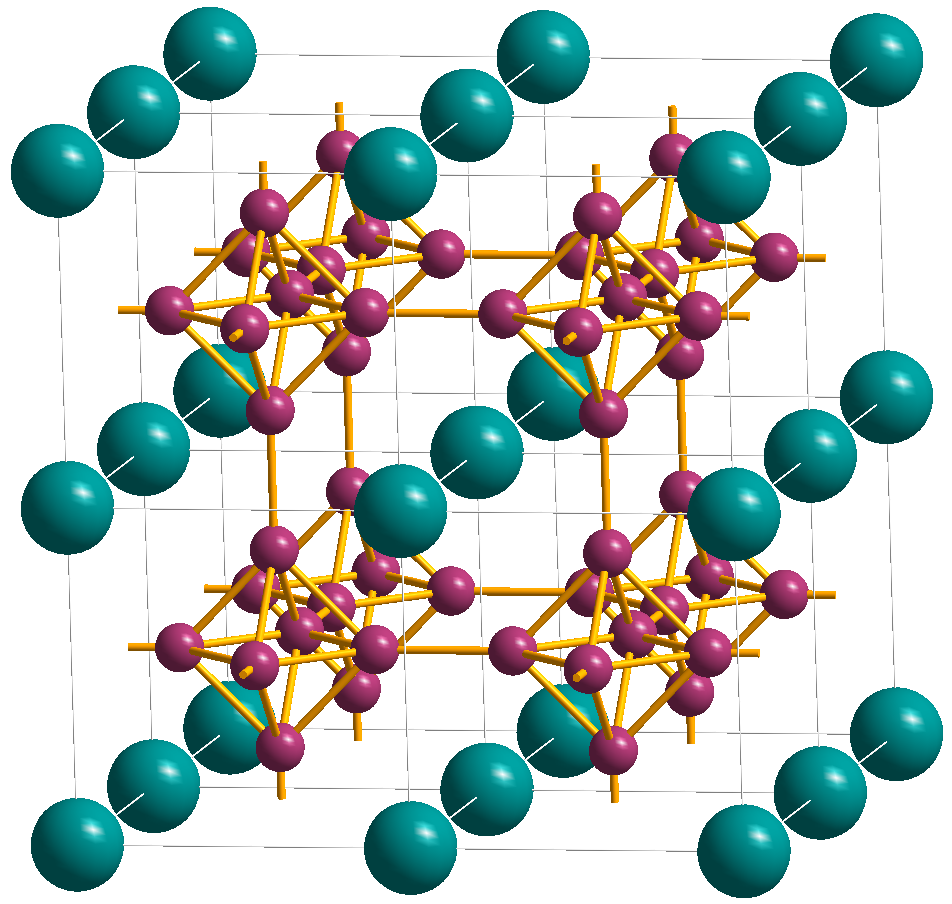

Identifiers
| CAS Number | 12008-30-9 |
| 3D model (JSmol) | Interactive image |
| ChemSpider | 58803190 |
| ECHA InfoCard | 100.031.384 |
| EC Number | 234-536-3 |
| PubChem CID | 133108844 |
| CompTox Dashboard (EPA) | DTXSID701315601 |
- InChI: InChI=1S/6B.Sm Key: IYKQPDWKORWUNW-UHFFFAOYSA-N
- SMILES: [B].[B].[B].[B].[B].[B].[Sm]

Properties
| Chemical formula | B_{6}Sm |
| Molar mass | 215.22 g·mol^{−1} |
| Melting point | 2400 °C ±100 |
- Except where otherwise noted, data are given for materials in their standard state (at 25 °C [77 °F], 100 kPa). Infobox references

Samarium hexaboride (SmB_{6}) is an intermediate-valence compound where samarium is present both as Sm^{2+} and Sm^{3+} ions at the ratio 3:7. It is a Kondo insulator having a metallic surface state.

== Early studies ==
It was first studied by soviet scientists in the early 1960s. Further studies were then undertaken at Bell Laboratories. By 1968 their researchers had noted changes in the electronic configuration at different temperatures. At temperatures above 50 K its properties are typical of a Kondo metal, with metallic electrical conductivity characterized by strong electron scattering, whereas at low temperatures, it behaves as a non-magnetic insulator with a narrow band gap of about 4–14 meV. The cooling-induced metal-insulator transition in SmB_{6} is accompanied by a sharp increase in thermal conductivity, peaking at about 15 K. The reason for this increase is that electrons do not contribute to thermal conductivity at low temperatures, which is instead dominated by phonons. The decrease in electron concentration reduced the rate of electron-phonon scattering.

== Twenty first century research ==
By the twenty first century condensed matter physicists grew more interested in SmB_{6} with claims that it may be a topological insulator. Other researchers found no evidence of topological surface states.

The increasing electrical resistance with a reduction in temperature indicates that the material behaves as an insulator; however, recent measurements reveal a Fermi surface (an abstract boundary of electrons in momentum space) characteristic of a good metal, indicating a more exotic dual metal-insulating ground state. The electrical resistivity at temperatures below 4K displays a distinct plateau, which is thought to be the coexistence of an insulating state (bulk) and a conducting state (surface). At temperatures approaching absolute zero, the quantum oscillations of the material grow as the temperature declines, a behavior that contradicts both the Fermi analysis and the rules that govern conventional metals. While it has been argued that quantum oscillations on samples grown from aluminium flux may arise from aluminum inclusions, such an explanation is excluded for samples grown by the image furnace method rather than by the flux growth method.

== See also ==
- Boride
