= Kondo insulator =

Strongly correlated system with a narrow band gap at low temperatures

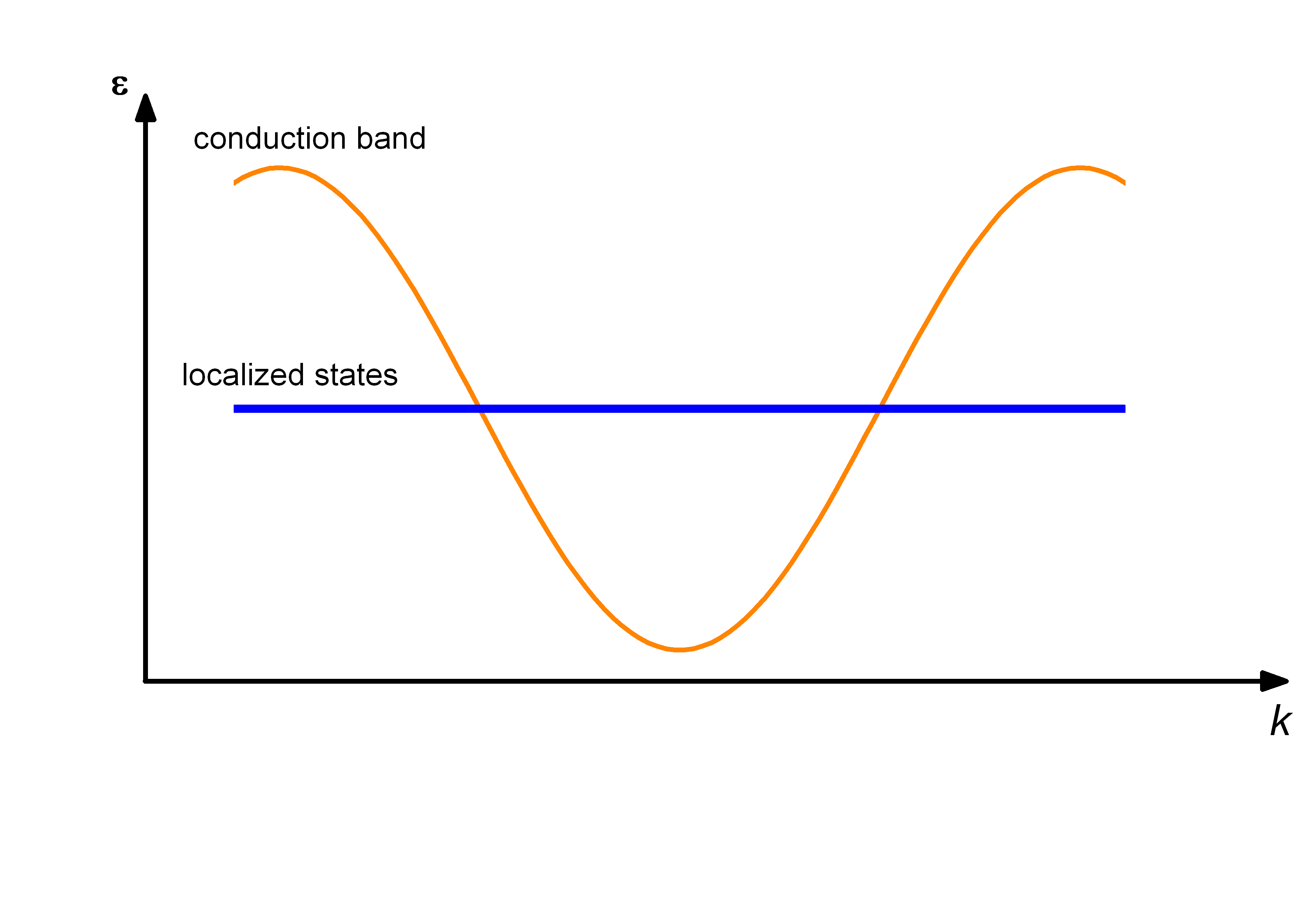
Dispersion relation of conduction band and localized states.

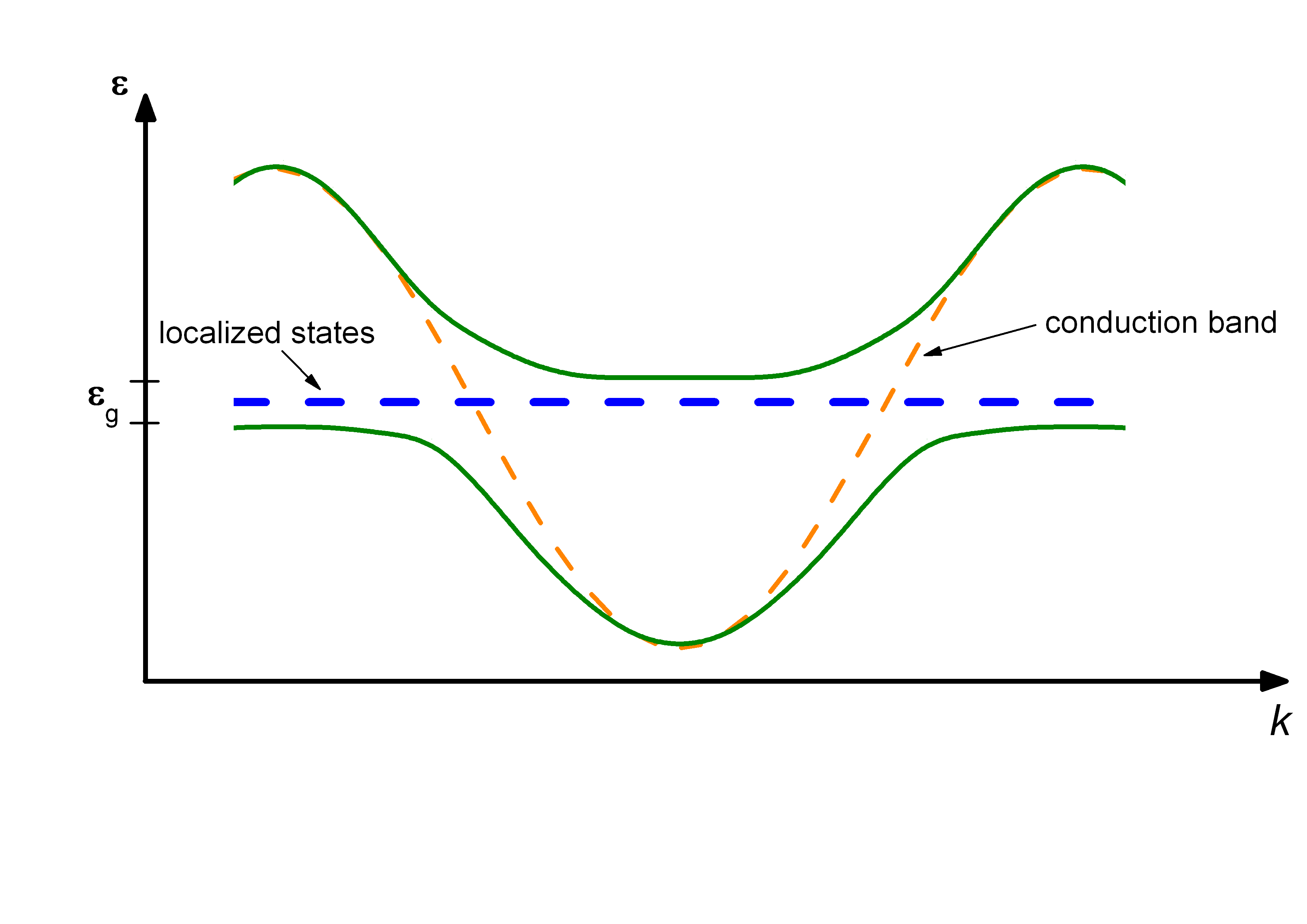
Hybridization and forming of an indirect energy (hybridization) gap due to the coherent Kondo screening of the local moments by the sea of conduction electrons.

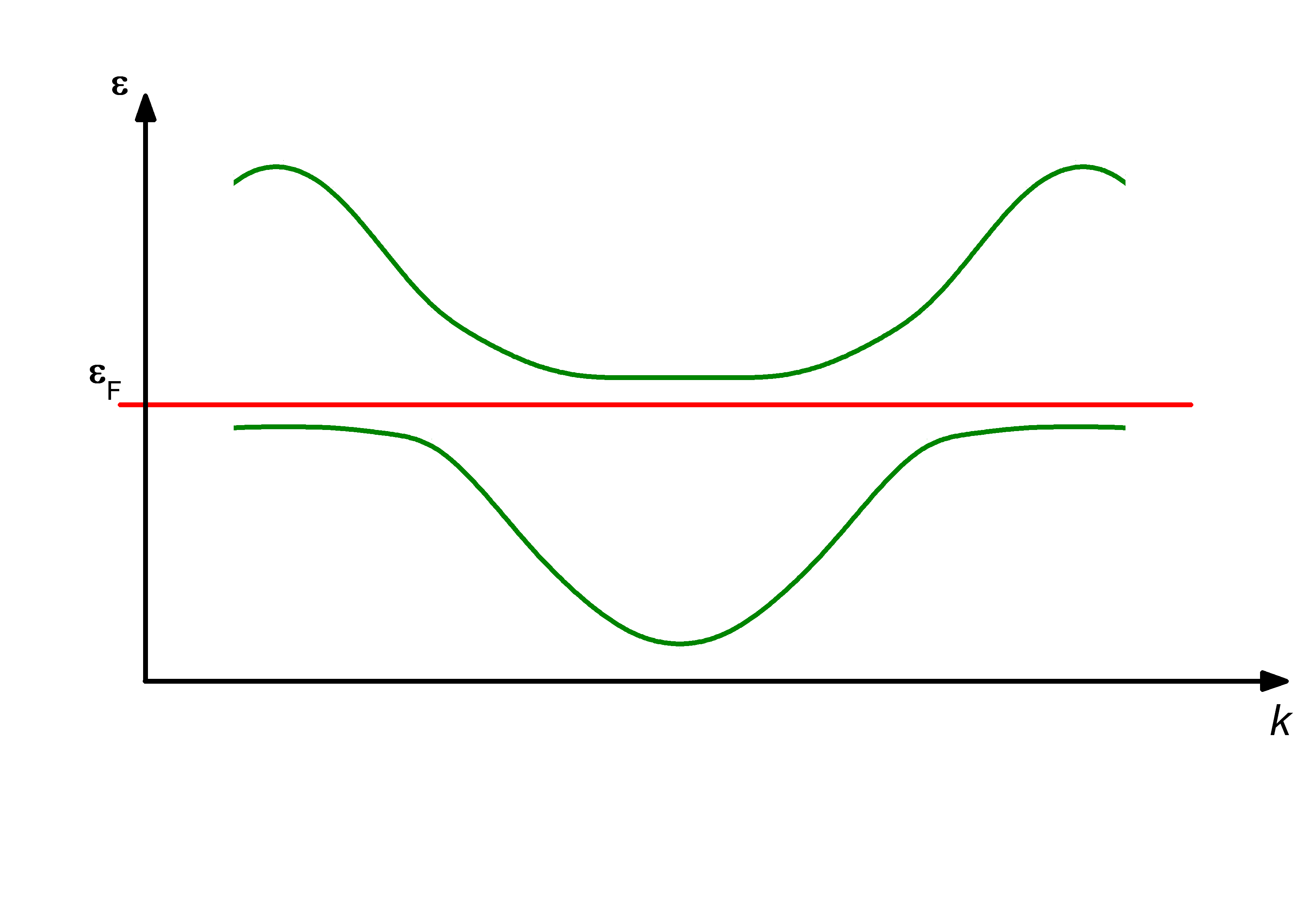
In case of Kondo insulators the Fermi level (chemical potential) is located in the hybridization gap.

In solid-state physics, Kondo insulators (also referred as Kondo semiconductors and heavy fermion semiconductors) are understood as materials with strongly correlated electrons, that open up a narrow band gap (in the order of 10 meV) at low temperatures with the chemical potential lying in the gap, whereas in heavy fermion materials the chemical potential is located in the conduction band.

The band gap opens up at low temperatures due to hybridization of localized electrons (mostly f-electrons) with conduction electrons, a correlation effect known as the Kondo effect. As a consequence, a transition from metallic to insulating behavior is seen in resistivity measurements. The band gap could be either direct or indirect. Most studied Kondo insulators are FeSi, Ce_{3}Bi_{4}Pt_{3}, SmB_{6}, YbB_{12}, and CeNiSn, although As of 2016 there are over a dozen known Kondo insulators.

== Historical overview ==
In 1969, Menth et al. found no magnetic ordering in SmB_{6} down to 0.35 K and a change from metallic to insulating behavior in the resistivity measurement with decreasing temperature. They interpreted this phenomenon as a change of the electronic configuration of Sm.

In 1992, Gabriel Aeppli and Zachary Fisk found a descriptive way to explain the physical properties of Ce_{3}Bi_{4}Pt_{3} and CeNiSn. They called the materials Kondo insulators, showing Kondo lattice behavior near room temperature, but becoming semiconducting with very small energy gaps (a few Kelvin to a few tens of Kelvin) when decreasing the temperature.

== Transport properties ==
At high temperatures the localized f-electrons form independent local magnetic moments. According to the Kondo effect, the dc-resistivity of Kondo insulators shows a logarithmic temperature-dependence. At low temperatures, the local magnetic moments are screened by the sea of conduction electrons, forming a so-called Kondo resonance. The interaction of the conduction band with the f-orbitals results in a hybridization and an energy gap $\epsilon_{\mathrm{g}}$. If the chemical potential lies in the hybridization gap, an insulating behavior can be seen in the dc-resistivity at low temperatures.

In recent times, angle-resolved photoemission spectroscopy experiments provided direct imaging of band-structure, hybridization and flat band topology in Kondo insulators and related compounds.
