= Anderson impurity model =

Hamiltonian used in quantum physics

The Anderson impurity model, named after Philip Warren Anderson, is a Hamiltonian that is used to describe magnetic impurities embedded in metals. It is often applied to the description of Kondo effect-type problems, such as heavy fermion systems and Kondo insulators. In its simplest form, the model contains a term describing the kinetic energy of the conduction electrons, a two-level term with an on-site Coulomb repulsion that models the impurity energy levels, and a hybridization term that couples conduction and impurity orbitals. For a single impurity, the Hamiltonian takes the form

$$H = \sum_{k,\sigma}\epsilon_k c^{\dagger}_{k\sigma}c_{k\sigma}
+ \sum_{\sigma}\epsilon_d d^{\dagger}_{\sigma}d_{\sigma}
+ Ud^{\dagger}_{\uparrow}d_{\uparrow}d^{\dagger}_{\downarrow}d_{\downarrow}
+ \sum_{k,\sigma}V_k(d^{\dagger}_{\sigma}c_{k\sigma} + c^{\dagger}_{k\sigma}d_{\sigma})$$,

where the $c$ operator is the annihilation operator of a conduction electron, and $d$ is the annihilation operator for the impurity, $k$ is the conduction electron wavevector, $\sigma$ labels the spin. The unperturbed single-electron energy, relative to the Fermi level, is $\epsilon_k$ for the conduction electrons and $\epsilon_d$ for impurity electrons. The The on–site Coulomb repulsion is $U$, and $V$ gives the hybridization.

== Regimes ==
The model yields several regimes that depend on the relationship of the impurity energy levels to the Fermi level $E_{\rm F}$:

- The empty orbital regime for $\epsilon_d \gg E_{\rm F}$, and the full orbital regime for $\epsilon_d+U \ll E_{\rm F}$, which have no local moment.
- The intermediate regime for $\epsilon_d\approx E_{\rm F}$ or $\epsilon_d+U\approx E_{\rm F}$.
- The local moment regime for $\epsilon_d \ll E_{\rm F} \ll \epsilon_d+U$, which yields a magnetic moment at the impurity.

In the local moment regime, the magnetic moment is present at the impurity site. However, for low enough temperature, the moment is Kondo screened to give non-magnetic many-body singlet state.

== Heavy-fermion systems ==
For heavy-fermion systems, a lattice of impurities is described by the periodic Anderson model. The one-dimensional model is

$$H = \sum_{k,\sigma}\epsilon_k c^{\dagger}_{k\sigma}c_{k\sigma}
+ \sum_{j,\sigma}\epsilon_f f^{\dagger}_{j\sigma}f_{j\sigma}
+ U\sum_{j}f^{\dagger}_{j\uparrow}f_{j\uparrow}f^{\dagger}_{j\downarrow}f_{j\downarrow}
+ \sum_{j,k,\sigma}V_{jk}(e^{ikx_j}f^{\dagger}_{j\sigma}c_{k\sigma} + e^{-ikx_j}c^{\dagger}_{k\sigma}f_{j\sigma})$$,

where $x_j$ is the position of impurity site $j$, and $f$ is the impurity creation operator (used instead of $d$ by convention for heavy-fermion systems). The hybridization term allows f-orbital electrons in heavy fermion systems to interact, although they are separated by a distance greater than the Hill limit.

== Other variants ==
There are other variants of the Anderson model, such as the SU(4) Anderson model, which is used to describe impurities which have an orbital, as well as a spin, degree of freedom. This is relevant in carbon nanotube quantum dot systems. The SU(4) Anderson model Hamiltonian is

$$H = \sum_{k,\sigma}\epsilon_k c^{\dagger}_{k\sigma}c_{k\sigma}
+ \sum_{i,\sigma}\epsilon_d d^{\dagger}_{i\sigma}d_{i\sigma}
+ \sum_{i,\sigma,i'\sigma '} \frac{U}{2}n_{i\sigma}n_{i'\sigma '}
+ \sum_{i,k,\sigma}V_k(d^{\dagger}_{i\sigma}c_{k\sigma} + c^{\dagger}_{k\sigma}d_{i\sigma})$$,

where $i$ and $i'$ label the orbital degree of freedom (which can take one of two values), and $n$ represents the number operator for the impurity.

== See also ==
- Hubbard model
- Kondo effect
- Kondo model
- Anderson localization
