= Zachary Fisk =

American physicist (born 1941)

- Born: September 3, 1941 (age 85); New York, United States
- Education: Harvard University (AB, 1964); University of California, San Diego (PhD, 1969)
- Spouses: Mary Bayley (m. 1964–1979); Jehanne Teilheit-Fisk (died 2002)
- Children: 2
- Awards: International Prize for New Materials (1990); Ernest Orlando Lawrence Award (1991); Bernd T. Matthias Prize (2015)
- Scientific career
- Workplaces: University of Chicago (1971–1972); University of California, San Diego (1961–1962, 1972–1981, 1991–1996); Los Alamos National Laboratory (1961) (1981–1994); Florida State University (1996–2003); University of California, Davis (2003–2006); University of California, Irvine (2006–present)
- Thesis: Magnetic Interactions in Rare-Earth Borides. (1969)
- Doctoral advisor: Bernd T. Matthias
- Website: https://faculty.uci.edu/profile/?facultyId=5451

Zachary Fisk (born September 3, 1941) is an American condensed matter physicist and distinguished professor at the physics and astronomy department at University of California, Irvine. Fisk attended Harvard University and graduated with a bachelor's degree in physics in 1964. He received his PhD in physics at the University of California, San Diego (UCSD) in 1969. In 1972, Fisk became a part of Bernd T. Matthias' research group at UCSD. There, Fisk researched superconductivity and refined crystal synthesis techniques. In 1980, after Matthias died, Fisk was recruited by Los Alamos National Laboratory. Fisk became a professor at the physics and astronomy department at the University of California, Irvine in 2006 and is currently a distinguished professor and professor emeritus there.

Fisk has received multiple awards for his work, including the International Prize for New Materials in 1990, the Ernest Orlando Lawrence Award in 1991, and the Bernd T. Matthias Prize in 2015. He is a member of the American Academy of Arts and Sciences, the National Academy of Sciences, the American Physical Society and the American Philosophical Society.

== Early life and education ==
Zachary Fisk was born on September 3, 1941, in New York to Cynthia Fisk and James Brown Fisk. James was a physicist and the president of Bell Labs from 1959 to 1973.

As a child, Fisk was intrigued by chemistry, but his father disapproved of his interest and did not allow him to have a chemistry set. Fisk pursued chemistry in secret, creating his own chemistry set in the basement using materials from around the house and in nature. Chemists who visited Fisk's home, such as William O. Baker, would help him with his experiments discreetly.

Fisk attended Phillips Exeter Academy before enrolling at Harvard University to study physics. In 1961, Fisk was briefly employed by the Los Alamos National Laboratory as a chemistry technician. From 1961 to 1962, he was a technician at the newly established University of California, San Diego (UCSD), where Bernd T. Matthias was working. In 1963, Fisk returned to Harvard and graduated with his bachelor's degree in physics in June 1964. In 1969, he received a PhD in physics from UCSD under the supervision of Matthias.

== Career ==
Fisk was an assistant professor of physics at the University of Chicago from 1970 to 1971. In 1972, Fisk returned to UCSD to work with Matthias as a research physicist. As a part of Matthias' research group, he worked with Brian Maple and other young researchers to discover new high-temperature superconductors. The research group received general advice from Matthias, but were otherwise free to pursue their own research interests. The group sought to understand the physics of the samples they synthesized, but the samples had defects and polycrystalline. To remedy this, Fisk started refining the technique of growing flux crystals. This fast, clean technique allowed him to grow a high-quality single crystal of Niobium-tin whose Fermi surface could be measured to understand its superconductivity. During the 1970s Fisk visited Los Alamos Laboratory multiple times, collaborating with other associates of Matthias.

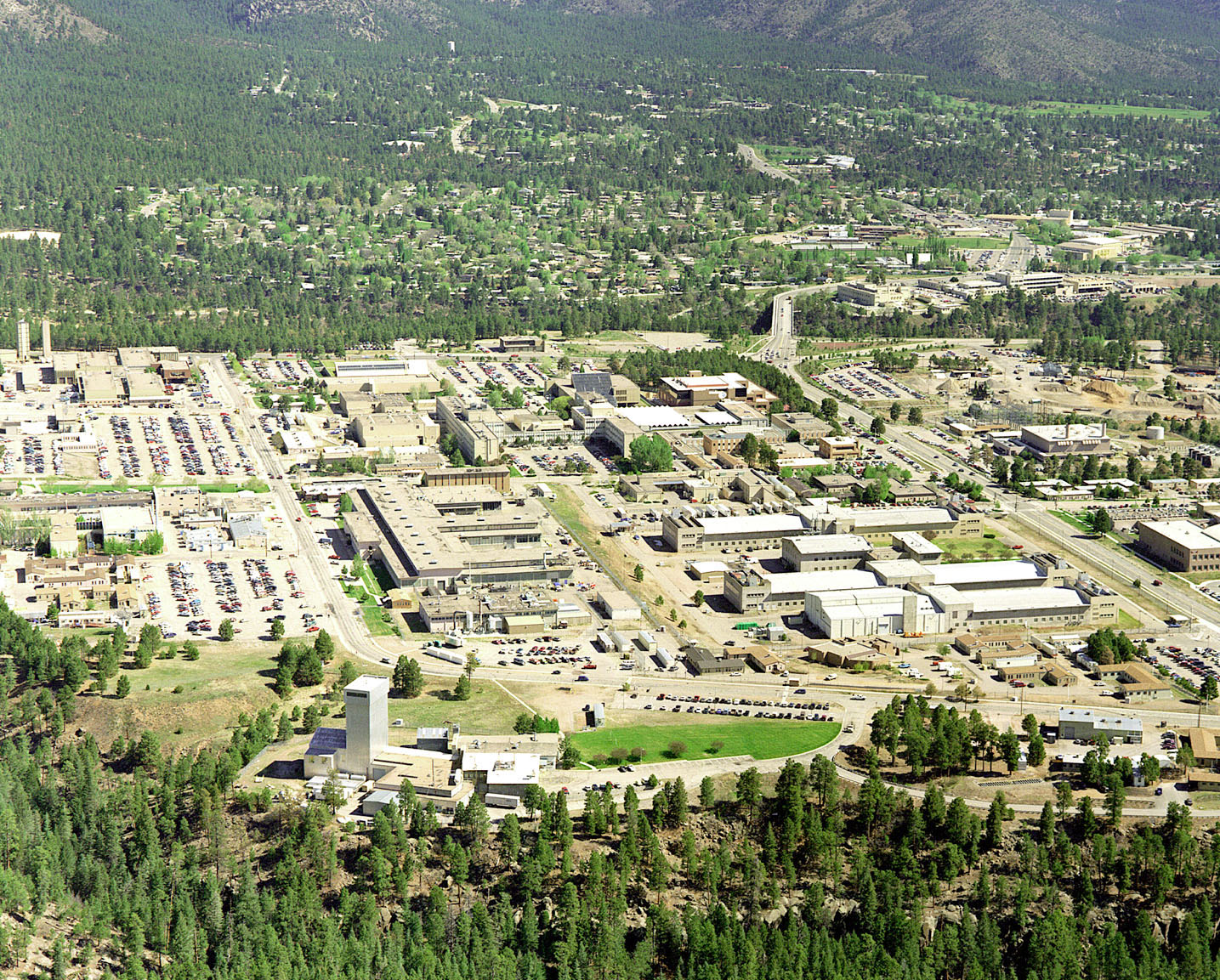
An aerial view of Los Alamos National Laboratory in 1995

On October 27, 1980, Matthias died. The following day, Los Alamos National Laboratory offered Fisk a job. He joined the laboratory as a fellow in 1981. The decision to join the laboratory was difficult for Fisk, as his wife, Jehanne Telheit-Fisk, was a tenured professor at UCSD. Fisk became interested in actinides while at UCSD and began researching them at Los Alamos, as they were unavailable at UCSD. Fisk and co-workers discovered superconductivity in uranium compounds UBe_{13} and UPt_{3}. These superconductors came to be known as heavy-fermion superconductors. In 1991, Fisk began splitting his time between Los Alamos and UCSD.

In 1994, Fisk joined the recently established National High Magnetic Field Laboratory at Florida State University. In the early 1990s, Fisk discovered Ce_{3}Bi_{4}Pt_{3}, which was part of a newly recognized class of compounds called kondo insulators. From 1996 to 2003, Fisk was a professor of physics at Florida State University. He was a professor of physics at University of California, Davis from 2003 to 2006.

Fisk became a professor at the department of physics and astronomy at the University of California, Irvine in 2006. He is currently a distinguished professor and professor emeritus there.

== Awards and honors ==
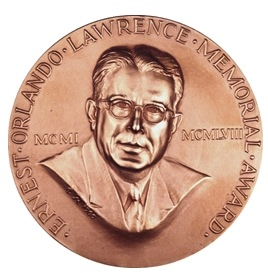
Ernest Orlando Lawrence Award medal (front)

In 1990, Fisk and three others were awarded the International Prize for New Materials from the American Physical Society for "the discovery of heavy fermion materials and pioneering research on the exotic and remarkable physical behavior of such systems." He received the Ernest Orlando Lawrence Award in 1991 for "the discovery and synthesis of new and novel magnetic and super-conducting materials and pioneering research on their properties." In 2015, Fisk was a co-recipient of the Bernd T. Matthias Prize.

In 1985, Fisk was the recipient of an American Physical Society fellowship for "important contributions to the synthesis and understanding of new materials in single crystal form, particularly high critical temperature superconductors and heavy Fermion superconductors." In 1995, Fisk was elected a member of the American Academy of Arts and Sciences. In 1996, he was elected a member of the National Academy of Sciences. On April 24, 2010, he was elected a member of the American Philosophical Society.

== Personal life ==
Fisk was married to Mary Bayley Fisk from 1964 to 1979. They had one daughter, Rebekah Worsley Fisk. He remarried Jehanne Telheit-Fisk. Jehanne was an art historian, with a PhD in art history from the University of California, Los Angeles. They had a daughter, Samantha Fisk. On August 28, 2002, Jehanne died of brain cancer.

Fisk is an avid reader. He enjoys biking, hiking, and running.

== Selected publications ==
- Ott, H.R.; Rudigier, H.; Fisk, Z.; Smith, J. L. (May 16, 1983). "UBe13: An Unconventional Actinide Superconductor". Physical Review Letters. 50 (20): 1595–1598. doi:10.1103/PhysRevLett.50.1595.
- Stewart, G. R.; Fisk, Z.; Willis, J. O.; Smith, J. L. (February 20, 1984). "Possibility of Coexistence of Bulk Superconductivity and Spin Fluctuations in UPt3". Physical Review Letters. 52 (8): 679–682. doi:10.1103/PhysRevLett.52.679.
- Fisk, Z.; Ott, H. R.; Rice, T. M.; Smith, J. L. (March 13, 1986). "Heavy-electron metals". Nature. 320 (6058): 124. Bibcode:1986Natur.320..124F. doi:10.1038/320124a0.
- Canfield, P. C.; Fisk, Zachary (1992). "Growth of single crystals from metallic fluxes". Philosophical Magazine B. 65 (6): 1117–1123. Bibcode:1992PMagB..65.1117C. doi:10.1080/13642819208215073 – via Taylor & Francis.

== See also ==
- List of Harvard University people
- List of University of California, San Diego people
- List of University of California, Irvine people
- List of University of Chicago people
- List of Florida State University people
- List of University of California, Davis faculty
- List of fellows of the American Physical Society (1972–1997)
- List of American Academy of Arts and Sciences members (1994–2005)
