= James C. McGroddy Prize =

Award of the American Physical Society

The James C. McGroddy Prize for New Materials is a prize that has been awarded annually by the American Physical Society since 1975, but was only given that name following its endowment by IBM in 1999. Prior to that it was known as the International Prize for New Materials. The recipients are chosen for "Outstanding achievement in the science and application of new materials". The prize is named after James C. McGroddy, himself a winner of APS's George E. Pake Prize in 1995, and comes with a cash award of $10,000.

== Recipients ==
- 2026: Thomas Mikolajick, Sayeef Salahuddin
- 2025: George Jackeli, Giniyat Khaliullin, Hidenori Takagi
- 2024: Harold Y. Hwang
- 2023: Emanuel Tutuc, James Hone, Kenji Watanabe, Takashi Taniguchi
- 2022: Daniel C. Ralph
- 2021: Darrell G. Schlom, Ivan Božović, James N. Eckstein
- 2020: Mikhail Eremets
- 2019: B. Andrei Bernevig, Claudia Felser, Xi Dai
- 2018: Rodney S. Ruoff
- 2017: Paul C. Canfield
- 2016: Mercouri Kanatzidis
- 2015: Hideo Hosono
- 2014: Zhong Lin Wang
- 2013: Costas M. Soukoulis, David R. Smith, John B. Pendry
- 2012: Robert Cava
- 2011: Arthur P. Ramirez
- 2010: Nicola A. Spaldin, Ramamoorthy Ramesh, Sang-Wook Cheong
- 2009: Akihisa Inoue, William L. Johnson
- 2008: Arthur F Hebard, Jun Akimitsu, Robert C. Haddon
- 2007: Arthur J. Epstein, Joel S. Miller
- 2006: Alex Zettl, Hongjie Dai
- 2005: Yoshinori Tokura
- 2004: Loren Pfeiffer
- 2003: Charles M. Lieber
- 2002: Donald S. Bethune, Sumio Iijima
- 2001: Arthur Charles Gossard
- 2000: M. Brian Maple
- 1999: Eugene E. Haller, Thomas Richard Anthony
- 1994: Peter Grünberg, Albert Fert, Stuart Parkin
- 1993: Gordon C. Osbourn
- 1992: Robert F. Curl, Harold W. Kroto, Richard E. Smalley
- 1991: Francis J. DiSalvo, Jr., Frederic Holtzberg
- 1990: James L. Smith, Hans R. Ott, Frank Steglich, Zachary Fisk
- 1989: J.B. MacChesney, R.D. Maurer, Charles K. Kao
- 1988: J. Georg Bednorz, Paul C. W. Chu, K. Alex Muller
- 1987: Dan Shechtman
- 1986: John Croat, Jan Herbst, Norman C. Koon, Masato Sagawa
- 1985: Leroy L. Chang, Leo Esaki, Raphael Tsu
- 1984: J. P. Remeika
- 1983: David Turnbull
- 1982: John R. Arthur, Jr., Alfred Y. Cho
- 1981: LeGrand G. van Uitert
- 1980: Pol E. Duwez, William Klement, Jr.
- 1979: J. Eugene Kunzler, Bernd T. Matthias, John K. Hulm
- 1978: J. H. Sinfelt
- 1977: Francis Bundy, H. Tracy Hall, Herbert Strong, Robert H. Wentorf, Jr.
- 1976: William G. Pfann, Henry C. Theurer
- 1975: Heinrich Welker

== See also ==
- List of physics awards
