= Francis P. Bundy =

American physicist (1910–2008)

Francis Pettit Bundy (September 1, 1910, Columbus, Ohio – February 23, 2008, Lebanon, Ohio) was an American physicist, known as a member of General Electric's team of researchers that in December 1954 created diamond chips by applying ultra high pressure (65 kbar) to graphite with iron sulfide as a catalyst.

== Biography ==
Bundy graduated in 1927 from Lancaster, Ohio's Lancaster High School and in 1931 from Westerfield, Ohio's Otterbein College, now named Otterbein University. In 1937 he received his Ph.D. in physics from Ohio State University. From 1937 to 1942 he taught at Ohio University. During World War II he worked in sonar research at the Harvard Underwater Sound Laboratory. In 1946 he went to General Electric's research laboratories in Schenectady, New York.

In 1951 General Electric started "Project Superpressure", managed by Anthony J. Nerad, to synthesize diamonds in the laboratory. In February 1955, General Electric announced that the research team consisting of Francis P. Bundy, H. Tracy Hall, Herbert M. Strong, and Robert H. Wentorf Jr. had synthesized "tiny diamonds made from a carbonaceous material subjected to extreme pressures and temperature." In 1977 the four team members jointly received the International Prize for New Materials, now called the James C. McGroddy Prize for New Materials, for "their outstanding research contributions and inventions which include the first reproducible process for making diamond; the synthesis of cubic boron nitride; and the development of the high pressure processes that are required to produce these materials."

Bundy was the author or co-author of over 100 scientific publications. He was elected in 1946 a Fellow of the Acoustical Society of America and in 1953 a Fellow of the American Physical Society. In 1987 he received the Bridgman Award.

Bundy gained considerable fame as a glider pilot. (His wife Hazel Bundy was also a glider pilot.) He logged over 8,000 glider flights, designed and built sailplanes, worked as an instructor and flight examiner, was very active in competitions, and sometimes served as a contest official. In 2001 he was inducted into the Hall of Fame of the National Soaring Museum.

On October 24, 1936 in Springfield, Illinois, he married Hazel Victoria Forwood (1910–2006). They had two sons and two daughters.

== Selected publications ==
- Bundy, F. P.; Hall, H. T.; Strong, H. M.; Wentorf Jr., R. H. (1955). "Man-Made Diamonds". Nature. 176 (4471): 51–55. Bibcode:1955Natur.176...51B. doi:10.1038/176051a0. S2CID 4266566. (over 1350 citations)
- Bundy, F. P.; Bovenkerk, H. P.; Strong, H. M.; Wentorf Jr., R. H. (1961). "Diamond-Graphite Equilibrium Line from Growth and Graphitization of Diamond". The Journal of Chemical Physics. 35 (2): 383–391. Bibcode:1961JChPh..35..383B. doi:10.1063/1.1731938.
- Bundy, F. P. (1961). "Effect of Pressure on emf of Thermocouples". Journal of Applied Physics. 32 (3): 483–488. Bibcode:1961JAP....32..483B. doi:10.1063/1.1736029.
- Bundy, F. P. (1962). "Direct Conversion of Graphite to Diamond in Static Pressure Apparatus". Science. 137 (3535): 1057–1058. Bibcode:1962Sci...137.1057B. doi:10.1126/science.137.3535.1057. PMID 17774419.
- Bundy, F. P. (1963). "Direct Conversion of Graphite to Diamond in Static Pressure Apparatus". The Journal of Chemical Physics. 38 (3): 631–643. Bibcode:1963JChPh..38..631B. doi:10.1063/1.1733716.
- Bundy, F. P.; Wentorf Jr., R. H. (1963). "Direct Transformation of Hexagonal Boron Nitride to Denser Forms". The Journal of Chemical Physics. 38 (5): 1144–1149. Bibcode:1963JChPh..38.1144B. doi:10.1063/1.1733815.
- Bundy, F. P.; Kasper, J. S. (1963). "A New Dense Form of Solid Germanium". Science. 139 (3552): 340–341. Bibcode:1963Sci...139..340B. doi:10.1126/science.139.3552.340. PMID 17781090. S2CID 127142.
- Bundy, F. P. (1964). "Phase Diagrams of Silicon and Germanium to 200 kbar, 1000°C". The Journal of Chemical Physics. 41 (12): 3809–3814. Bibcode:1964JChPh..41.3809B. doi:10.1063/1.1725818.
- Bundy, F. P.; Kasper, J. S. (1967). "Hexagonal Diamond—A New Form of Carbon". The Journal of Chemical Physics. 46 (9): 3437–3446. Bibcode:1967JChPh..46.3437B. doi:10.1063/1.1841236.
- Hanneman, R. E.; Strong, H. M.; Bundy, F. P. (1967). "Hexagonal Diamonds in Meteorites: Implications". Science. 155 (3765): 995–997. Bibcode:1967Sci...155..995H. doi:10.1126/science.155.3765.995. PMID 17830485. S2CID 31626060.
- Corrigan, F. R.; Bundy, F. P. (1975). "Direct transitions among the allotropic forms of boron nitride at high pressures and temperatures". The Journal of Chemical Physics. 63 (9): 3812. Bibcode:1975JChPh..63.3812C. doi:10.1063/1.431874.
- Spain, Ian L.; Paauwe, Jac, eds. (1977). "Chapter 8. Synthesis of Diamond and Superhard Materials by Francis P. Bundy". High Pressure Technology. Volume 2: Applications and Processes. New York & Basel: Marcel Dekker. pp. 321–338. doi:10.1201/9780203751985-8. ISBN 0-8247-6591-5.
- Wentorf Jr., R. H.; Devries, R. C.; Bundy, F. P. (1980). "Sintered Superhard Materials". Science. 208 (4446): 873–880. doi:10.1126/science.208.4446.873. PMID 17772811. S2CID 34588568.
- Bundy, Francis P. (1980). "The P, T phase and reaction diagram for elemental carbon, 1979". Journal of Geophysical Research. 85 (B12): 6930. Bibcode:1980JGR....85.6930B. doi:10.1029/JB085iB12p06930.
- Bundy, F. (1988). "Ultra-high pressure apparatus". Physics Reports. 167 (3): 133–176. Bibcode:1988PhR...167..133B. doi:10.1016/0370-1573(88)90174-3.
- Bundy, F.P. (1989). "Pressure-temperature phase diagram of elemental carbon". Physica A: Statistical Mechanics and Its Applications. 156 (1): 169–178. Bibcode:1989PhyA..156..169B. doi:10.1016/0378-4371(89)90115-5.
- Bundy, F.P.; Bassett, W.A.; Weathers, M.S.; Hemley, R.J.; Mao, H.U.; Goncharov, A.F. (1996). "The pressure-temperature phase and transformation diagram for carbon; updated through 1994". Carbon. 34 (2): 141–153. Bibcode:1996Carbo..34..141B. doi:10.1016/0008-6223(96)00170-4.
