= Bernd T. Matthias Prize =

The Bernd Theodor Matthias Prize is a science award for innovative contributions to the material aspects of superconductivity.

== Summary ==
Bernd Theodor Matthias Prize is presented since 1989 by the Bell Labs, created by friends and colleagues of prof. Bernd T. Matthias.

Since 2000, the Prize has been sponsored by the Texas Center for Superconductivity at the University of Houston. The Prize consists of $5,000 USD and a special framed certificate.

== List of laureates ==
Year	Name	Nationality	Citation
1989	Theodore H. Geballe	United States	Inaugural Prize.
1991	Hiroshi Maeda; Yoshinori Tokura	Japan; Japan	
1994	Chu Ching-wu; Bernard Raveau; Maw-Kuen Wu	Taiwan; France; Taiwan	
1997	Bertram Batlogg; Robert Cava	Austria; United States	
2000	M. Brian Maple	United States	
2003	Jun Akimitsu	Japan	
2006	Frank Steglich	Germany	
2009	Yoshiteru Maeno; Hideo Hosono	Japan; Japan	
2012	Ivan Bozovic; Dirk Johrendt; James N Eckstein	United States; Germany; United States	
2015	Chen Xianhui; Zachary Fisk; Zhao Zhongxian	China; United States; China	
2018	Katsuya Shimizu	Japan	For his discovery of superconductivity in nonsuperconducting elements under high pressures with a Tc up to 29K.
2022	Mikhail Eremets	Belarus	

== See also ==
- Bernd T. Matthias
