= Robert H. Wentorf Jr. =

- Born: May 28, 1926; West Bend, Wisconsin
- Died: April 3, 1997 (aged 70); Easton, New York
- Known for: materials science
- Awards: American Chemical Society, Ipatieff Prize, American Society for Metals, Engineering Materials Achievement Award, Eastern New York Patent Law Association's Inventor of the Year Award, the American Physical Society's International Prize for New Materials, Achievement Award, and Man-of-the-Year Award of the Abrasive Engineering Society
- Scientific career
- Institutions: General Electric, Rensselaer Polytechnic Institute

Robert H. Wentorf Jr. (May 28, 1926, in West Bend, Wis. – April 3, 1997, in Easton, N.Y.) was a staff scientist at General Electric Corporate Research and Development Laboratory in Schenectady, N.Y. and a professor of chemical engineering at Rensselaer Polytechnic Institute in Troy, N.Y.

Wentorf was a chemical engineer and physical chemist who specialized in the synthesis of diamond and other superhard materials under conditions of high temperature and pressure. He is best known as the inventor of cubic boron nitride (trade name, Borazon), the second-hardest material known. Borazon is used industrially as a substitute for diamond where chemical reactivity or high temperature is a problem in grinding or cutting.

He also worked on diamond synthesizing projects. He contributed to the chemical understanding of the reactions involved in synthesis of diamond, as well as to the design of necessary apparatus and the transition to production level. He also invented a process for growing single large diamond crystals in a thermal gradient.

Wentorf received many honors for his work, including the American Chemical Society's Ipatieff Prize in 1965, the American Society for Metals' Engineering Materials Achievement Award in 1973, Eastern New York Patent Law Association's Inventor of the Year Award in 1975 (with Bill Rocco), the American Physical Society's International Prize for New Materials in 1977 (with his colleagues, Francis P. Bundy, H. Tracy Hall, and Herbert M. Strong, in the high pressure team), the Industrial Research Institute's Achievement Award in 1977, and three IR-100 awards. In 1986, he also received the Man-of-the-Year Award of the Abrasive Engineering Society for contributions to abrasives and grinding technology; he was specifically cited for his invention and development of Borazon.

His description of scientific research is often quoted:

When one is on new ground, the only way to discover the ground rules is to try many things. Of course, one is guided by basic principles, but the main idea is to make mistakes as fast as possible, and never to repeat a mistake.
