= Paul Chu =

Paul Chu may refer to:

- Paul Ching Wu Chu, physicist known for work on superconductivity, and president of The Hong Kong University of Science and Technology
- Paul K. Chu, professor at City University of Hong Kong
