= Herbert Strong =

Herbert Strong may refer to:

- Herbert Strong (philologist) (1841–1918), Australian scholar and professor of comparative philology
- Herbert Strong (golfer) (1880–1944), English golfer
- Herbert Maxwell Strong (1908–2002), American physicist and inventor
