= Chen Xianhui =

Chinese physicist (born 1963)

Chen Xianhui (Chinese: 陈仙辉; pinyin: Chén Xīanhuī; born March 8, 1963) is a Chinese physicist. He is a Changjiang professor of physics of the University of Science and Technology of China (USTC). He was elected an academician of the Chinese Academy of Sciences (CAS) in 2015 and is known for his breakthroughs on iron-based superconductors. He won the State Natural Science Award (First Class) with Zhao Zhongxian and others in 2013 and the Bernd T. Matthias Prize for Superconducting Materials in 2015. His research is mainly on experimental condensed matter physics and materials science. In 2016, he became a laureate of the Asian Scientist 100 by the Asian Scientist.

== Recognition ==
1. 2009: "Changjiang Scholars Achievement Award" from Ministry of Education”.
2. 2009: “Outstanding Science & Technology Team Achievement Award” from Hong Kong Qiu Shi Science and Technologies Foundation.
3. 2009: “Ye Qisun Physics Prize” from Chinese Physical Society (2008–2009) .
4. 2013: “First prize of The National Natural Science Award”.
5. 2015: “Bernd T. Matthias Prize for Superconducting Materials”.
