= Mount John University Observatory =

Astronomical research observatory in New Zealand

University of Canterbury Mt John Observatory (UCMJO)
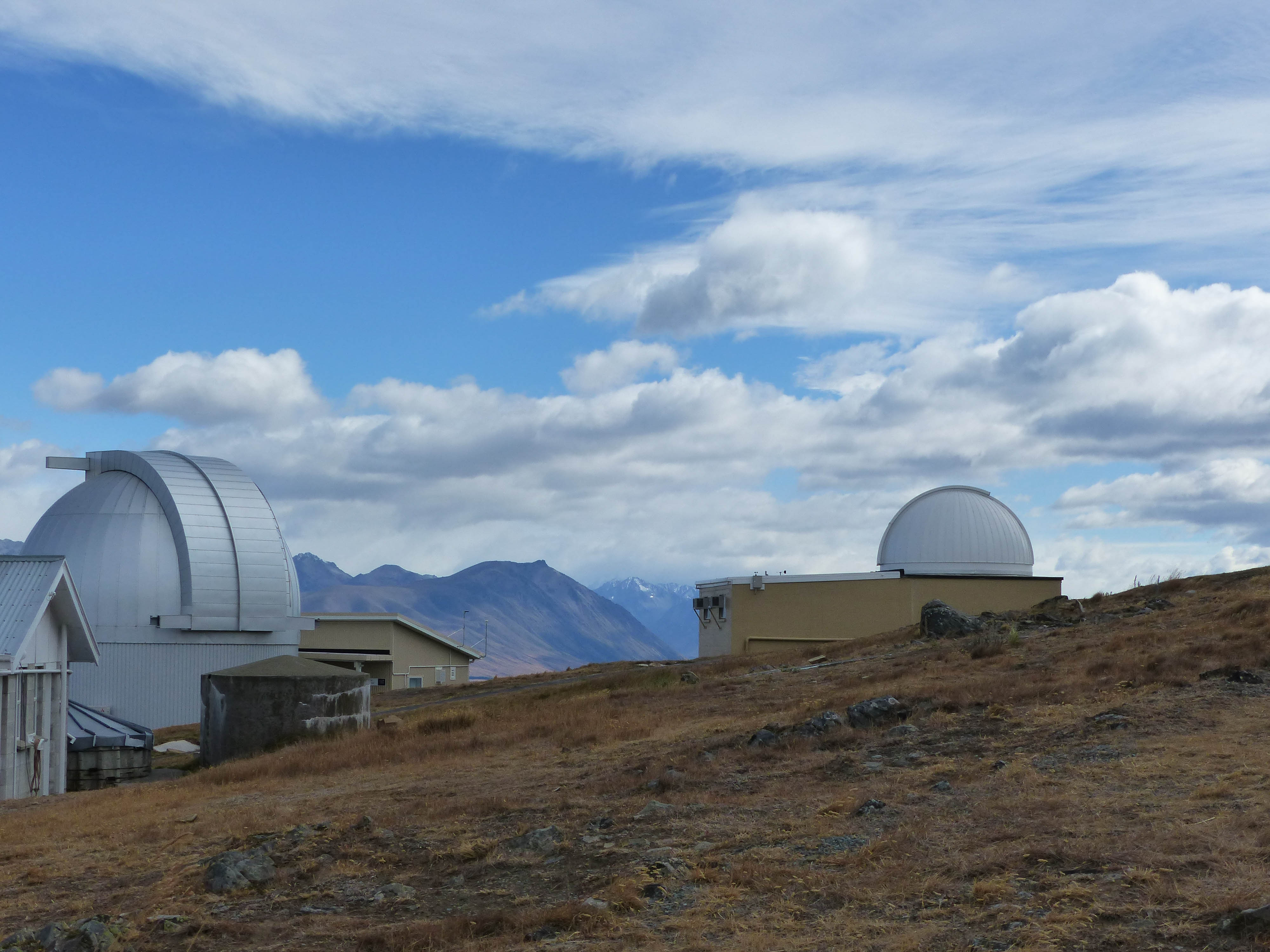
- UC Mount John Observatory at the top of Mount John
- Organization: University of Canterbury
- Observatory code: 474
- Location: Mackenzie District, South Island, New Zealand
- Coordinates: 43°59.2′S 170°27.9′E
- Altitude: 1,029 metres (3,376 ft)
- Weather: 20% of nights photometric
- Established: 1965
- Website: UC Mt John Observatory

Telescopes
- MOA Telescope: 1.8-metre
- McLellan: 1-metre
- Optical Craftsmen: 0.6-metre Cassegrain
- Boller and Chivens: 0.6-metre
- Dark Sky Project: 0.4-metre Meade
- Related media on Commons

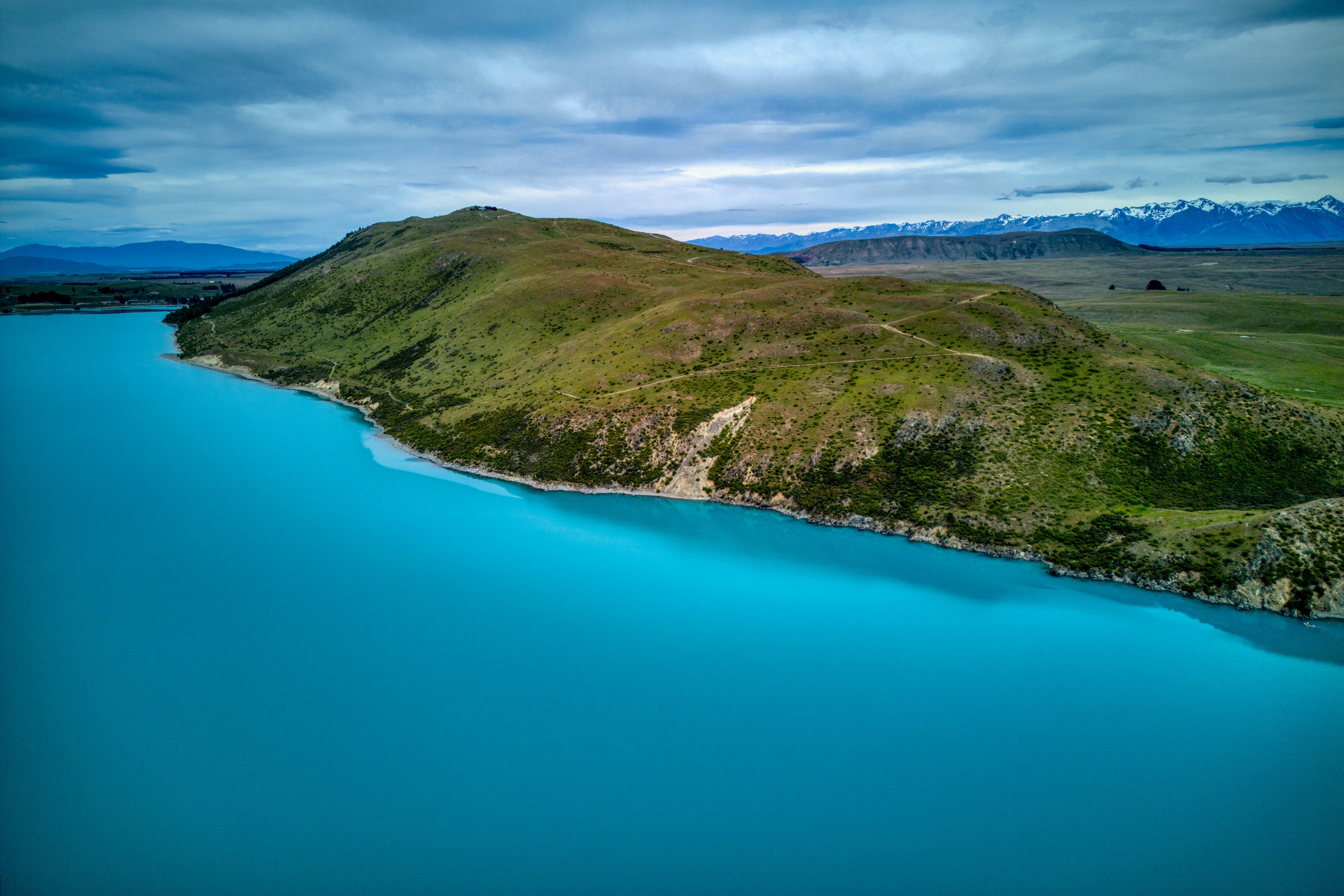
Mount John from Lake Tekapo

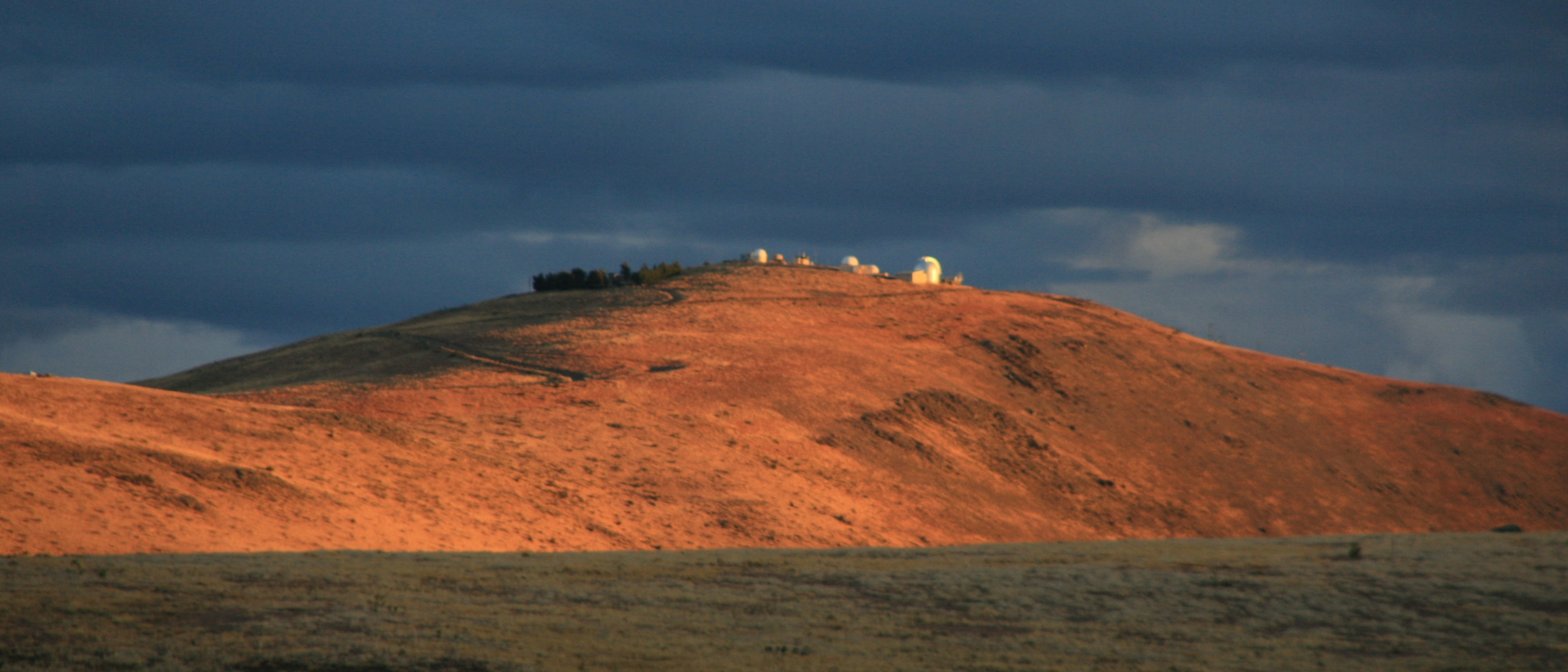
UCMJO site at sunset in 2007

University of Canterbury Mount John Observatory (UCMJO), previously known as Mt John University Observatory (MJUO), is New Zealand's premier astronomical research observatory. It is situated at 1,029 metres (3,376 ft) ASL atop Mount John at the northern end of the Mackenzie Basin in the South Island, and was established in 1965. There are many telescopes on site including: one 0.4 metre, two 0.6 metre, one 1.0 metre, and a 1.8 metre MOA telescope. The nearest population centre is the resort town of Lake Tekapo. Approximately 20% of nights at UCMJO are photometric, with a larger number available for spectroscopic work and direct imaging photometry.

UCMJO is operated by the University of Canterbury, and is the home of HERCULES (High Efficiency and Resolution Canterbury University Large Echelle Spectrograph), and the observational wing of the Japanese/New Zealand MOA collaboration (Microlensing Observations in Astrophysics) led by Yasushi Muraki of Nagoya University. A Japanese funded, 1.8 metre telescope was used initially by the MOA Project, before handover to the University of Canterbury at the conclusion of the MOA Project in 2012.

In June 2012 an area of 430,000 hectares (1,700 sq mi) around the observatory was declared as the Aoraki Mackenzie International Dark Sky Reserve by the International Dark-Sky Association, one of only four such reserves around the world at that time. The area has a Bortle Scale of 2.

== Facilities ==
There are 5 large telescopes on the mountain that are in regular use. There is also a cafe and night-tours run by tourist operators, Dark Sky Project. There is accommodation for visiting researchers within the 1.0 m telescope building. A superintendent lives on the mountain.

=== MOA telescope ===
Opened in December 2004, this telescope was built by Japanese astronomers and is dedicated to the Microlensing Observations in Astrophysics (MOA) project. It is a 1.8 m prime focus reflector. The MOA telescope is the largest optical telescope in New Zealand.

=== McLellan telescope ===
This is a 1.0 m Dall-Kirkham reflecting telescope run at either f/7.7 or f/13.5. It was installed in February 1986. Photometric imaging is by CCD camera and spectroscopy is by fibre-optic cable to the HERCULES spectrograph.

The McLellan telescope is named after Alister McLellan who was the Head of the Department of Physics at University of Canterbury from 1955 to 1985. He was instrumental in the development of the Mt John Observatory and when it opened in 1965 he was appointed its first director.

=== Boller & Chivens telescope ===
This is a 0.61 m reflecting telescope run at either f/13.5 or occasionally f/6.25. Photometry is usually carried out using an FLI CCD camera.

=== Optical Craftsmen telescope ===
This is a 0.61 m fork mounted reflecting telescope operating at f/16. This telescope is used exclusively for CCD photometry. It has been upgraded and commissioned for robotic use as part of the AAVSO's Robotic Telescope Network. This is the AAVSO's first Southern Hemisphere telescope.

=== Dark Sky Project telescope ===
This telescope, used exclusively for visual tourist operations is a 0.4 m Meade LX200 telescope.

== Discoveries ==
In June 2008 it was reported at the meeting of American Astronomical Society that using their new MOA-II telescope, the observatory discovered what was at the time the smallest planet known outside of the Solar System. The planet MOA-2007-BLG-192Lb is just 3.3 times larger than Earth and is orbiting a small star, MOA-2007-BLG-192L (3000 light years from Earth). There is some possibility the planet has a thick atmosphere and a liquid ocean on its surface.

== Climate ==
Climate data for Mount John, elevation 1,027 m (3,369 ft), (1981–2010)
Month	Jan	Feb	Mar	Apr	May	Jun	Jul	Aug	Sep	Oct	Nov	Dec	Year
Mean daily maximum °C (°F)	19.6 (67.3)	19.5 (67.1)	16.8 (62.2)	13.0 (55.4)	9.2 (48.6)	6.2 (43.2)	4.9 (40.8)	6.3 (43.3)	9.9 (49.8)	12.6 (54.7)	14.9 (58.8)	17.4 (63.3)	12.5 (54.5)
Daily mean °C (°F)	13.9 (57.0)	14.1 (57.4)	11.7 (53.1)	8.9 (48.0)	5.6 (42.1)	3.0 (37.4)	1.6 (34.9)	2.9 (37.2)	5.6 (42.1)	7.8 (46.0)	9.9 (49.8)	11.7 (53.1)	8.1 (46.5)
Mean daily minimum °C (°F)	8.1 (46.6)	8.6 (47.5)	6.5 (43.7)	4.7 (40.5)	2.0 (35.6)	−0.2 (31.6)	−1.7 (28.9)	−0.5 (31.1)	1.3 (34.3)	2.9 (37.2)	4.9 (40.8)	5.9 (42.6)	3.5 (38.4)
Average rainfall mm (inches)	42.3 (1.67)	32.9 (1.30)	51.7 (2.04)	56.5 (2.22)	53.6 (2.11)	50.7 (2.00)	44.8 (1.76)	60.9 (2.40)	43.3 (1.70)	57.5 (2.26)	40.8 (1.61)	50.9 (2.00)	585.9 (23.07)
Source: CliFlo (rain 1971–2000)

== Notable people ==
Notable people who have been associated with the Mount John University Observatory include:

- Frank Bateson
- Alan C. Gilmore
- Gerard F. Gilmore
- John Hearnshaw
- Pamela M. Kilmartin
- Alister McLellan
- Norman Rumsey
- William Tobin
