= IRI Achievement Award =

Picture of IRI Achievement Award.

The IRI Achievement Award, established by the Industrial Research Institute (IRI) in 1973, is awarded "to honor outstanding accomplishment in individual creativity and innovation that contributes broadly to the development of industry and to the benefit of society." The recipient is first nominated by an IRI member organization for his or her invention, innovation, or process improvement, and then voted on by a nine-member Awards Committee, led by the immediate past-chairman of IRI's Board of Directors.

The bronze sculpture known as the IRI Achievement Award represents the flight of innovation. The artist who designed the sculpture is John Blair. This award is presented each spring during IRI's Annual Meeting and is one of the highest honors awarded by the organization.

== List of Recipients ==
Year	Recipient	Achievement
1974	William F. Gresham (DuPont)	Instant Color Film
1975	William G. Pfann (Bell Labs)	Ultra-High Purity Materials
1976	Maurice R. Hilleman (Merck)	Vaccines
1977	LeGrand Van Uitert (Bell Labs)	Electronic Materials
1978	Robert H. Wentorf, Jr. (General Electric)	Synthetic Diamonds and Cubic Boron Nitride
1979	Frank B. Colton (G.D. Searle & Co.)	Oral Contraceptives
1980	Stanley D. Stookey (Corning)	Photochromic Glasses
1981	Andrew H. Bobeck (Bell Labs)	Bubble Memory
1982	Robert N. Noyce (Intel)	Silicon Integrated Circuits
1983	Herbert W. Boyer (University of California)	Recombinant DNA
1984	John W. Backus (IBM)	FORTRAN
1985	Allan S. Hay (General Electric)	Polymerization by Oxidative Coupling
1986	John E. Franz (Monsanto)	Roundup
1987	Robert D. Maurer (Corning)	Glass Fiber Wave Guides
1988	Howard G. Rogers (Polaroid)	Polyolefins
1989	Alfred Y. Cho (Bell Labs)	Molecular Beam Epitaxy
1990	Robert H. Dennard (IBM)	One-Transistor Dynamic Memory Cell
1991	Leonard S. Cutler (Hewlett-Packard)	Cesium Atomic Beam Clock
1992	Victor Mills (Procter & Gamble)	Synthetic Diamonds
1993	Richard H. Frenkiel (Bell Labs)	Cellular Telephones
1994	Marvin M. Johnson (Phillips Petroleum)	Passivating Agents for Catalytic Cracking
1995	Marinus Los (American Cyanamid)	Imidazolinone Herbicides
1996	Andrzej M. Pawlak (General Motors)	Electromechanical Devices
1997	Stephanie Kwolek (DuPont)	Liquid Crystal Polymers (Kevlar)
1998	Simon F. Campbell (Pfizer)	Medicinal Chemistry and Drug Discovery
1999	James E. West (Bell Labs/Lucent)	Foil Electret Microphone
2000	Harry W. Coover (Eastman Chemical)	Cyanoacrylate Adhesives
2001	C. Donald Bateman (Honeywell)	GPWS and Enhanced GPWS
2002	George Beall (Corning)	Breakthrough Innovations of Glass
2003	Madan M. Bhasin (Dow Chemical)	Industrial Catalysis & Emission Reductions
2004	Edith M. Flanigen (UOP)	Molecular Sieve Technology
2005	Dennis M. Ritchie (Bell Labs/AT&T/Lucent)	Unix Operating System
2006	Paul D. Trokhan (Procter & Gamble)	Unique Density Paper Structures
2007	Rakesh Agrawal (Purdue University)	Cryogenic Air Separation
2008	Dean L. Kamen (DEKA Research)	Technologies that enhance quality of life
2009	Ashok V. Joshi (Ceramatec)	New applications in Ionic Membranes
2010	Linden S. Blue (General Atomics)	Military strategy, energy research, and 2nd Gen. Modular Helium Reactors (MHRs)
2011	Richard Hayes (DuPont)	Polyacetal resins, modified polyesters, infrared absorbers, and gas separation membranes
2012	John J. Curro (Procter & Gamble)	Solid State Formation Technology
2015	Charles W. Hull (3D Systems)	Stereolithography
2018	Tan Le (Emotiv)	Electroencephalography

== See also ==
- Industrial Research Institute
- Maurice Holland Award
- IRI Medal
