= Paul Ching Wu Chu =

Chinese-American physicist (born 1941)

- 朱經武
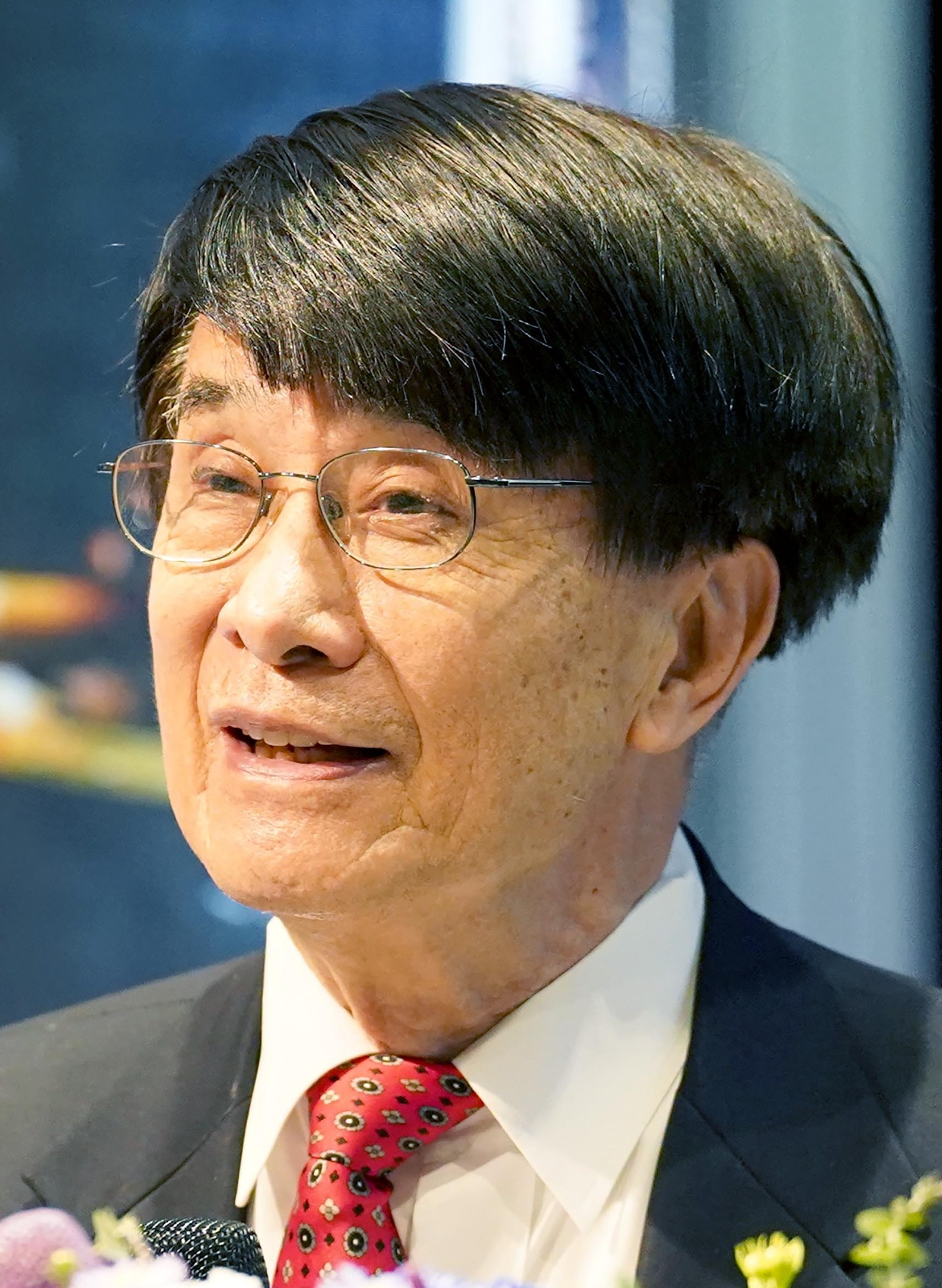
- Chu in 2024

2nd President of Hong Kong University of Science and Technology
- In office 2001–2009
- Chancellor: Tung Chee-hwa; Donald Tsang
- Preceded by: Woo Chia-wei
- Succeeded by: Tony F. Chan

Personal details
- Born: December 2, 1941 (age 84) Changsha, Hunan, China
- Citizenship: Republic of China; United States
- Education: National Cheng Kung University (BS); Fordham University (MS); University of California, San Diego (PhD)
- Scientific career
- Awards: Comstock Prize in Physics (1988); National Medal of Science (1988); Bernd T. Matthias Prize (1994); John Fritz Medal (2001)
- Fields: Physics
- Institutions: Bell Laboratories; Cleveland State University; University of Houston; HKUST (2001–2009); Taiwan Comprehensive University System (2012–)
- Thesis: High pressure study on the superconductivity of transition metals and alloys (1968)
- Doctoral advisor: Bernd T. Matthias

Chinese name
- Traditional Chinese: 朱經武
- Simplified Chinese: 朱经武
Transcriptions
Standard Mandarin
- Hanyu Pinyin: Zhū Jīng Wǔ
Yue: Cantonese
- Jyutping: Zyu^{1} Ging^{1} Mou^{5}

Paul Ching Wu Chu (Chinese: 朱經武; born December 2, 1941) is a Taiwanese-American physicist specializing in superconductivity, magnetism, and dielectrics. He is a professor of physics and T.L.L. Temple Chair of Science in the Physics Department at the University of Houston College of Natural Sciences and Mathematics. He was the president of the Hong Kong University of Science and Technology from 2001 to 2009. In 1987, he was one of the first scientists to demonstrate high-temperature superconductivity. He co-founded the University of California Chinese Alumni Association.

== Early life and education ==
Chu was born in Changsha, Hunan, Republic of China in 1941. Chu's family was from Taishan, Guangdong. Chu spent his childhood in Taiwan.

In 1958, Chu graduated from Taichung Municipal Cingshuei Senior High School. He then earned a Bachelor of Science (B.S.) in physics from National Cheng Kung University in 1962, a Master of Science (M.S.) from Fordham University in 1965, and his Ph.D. from the University of California, San Diego, in 1968.

== Career ==
After two years of performing industrial research with Bell Laboratories at Murray Hill, New Jersey, Chu was appointed assistant professor of physics at Cleveland State University in 1970. He was subsequently promoted to associate professor and professor of physics in 1973 and 1975, respectively.

In 1979, Chu became a professor of physics at the University of Houston, an appointment he still holds. In 1987, he and Maw-Kuen Wu announced the historic discovery of superconductivity above 77 K in YBCO, touching off a frenzy of scientific excitement exemplified by the Woodstock of physics, at which he was a featured presenter. He was then appointed the director of the Texas Center for Superconductivity. Chu has served as the T.L.L. Temple Chair of Science at the same university since 1987. He also has served as a consultant and visiting staff member at Bell Laboratories, Los Alamos Scientific Laboratory, the Marshall Space Flight Center, Argonne National Laboratory and DuPont at various times.

Chu has received numerous awards and honors for his outstanding work in superconductivity, including the National Medal of Science and the Comstock Prize in Physics in 1988, and the American Physical Society's International Prize for New Materials. He was an invited contributor to the White House National Millennium Time Capsule at the National Archives in 2000 and was selected the Best Researcher in the U.S. by U.S. News & World Report in 1990.

In 1989, Chu was elected a Fellow of the American Academy of Arts and Sciences. He is a member of the National Academy of Sciences, Chinese Academy of Sciences (foreign member), Academia Sinica, Russian Academy of Engineering (RAE) and the Third World Academy of Sciences. His research activities extend beyond superconductivity to magnetism and dielectrics.

On November 17, 2014, an IEEE Milestone in Electrical Engineering and Computing plaque was presented to University of Houston for Chu and his team's 1987 discovery of high temperature superconductors.

On September 1, 2001, Chu succeeded Professor Chia-Wei Woo as the president of The Hong Kong University of Science and Technology. Chu's tenure as university president ended officially on 1 September 2009.

On November 5, 2011, Chu was appointed as the founding President of the Taiwan Comprehensive University System (TCUS).

== Personal life ==
He is married to May Chu, the daughter of Shiing-Shen Chern.

== Awards and honors ==
- Honorary Doctor of Science (Sc.D.) degree from Whittier College. (1991)
- 2014 IEEE Council on Superconductivity Max Swerdlow Award for Sustained Service to the Applied Superconductivity Community.

== Lectures ==
- 1991 – High temperature superconductivity: four years later Lecture sponsored by the Dept. of Electrical and Computer engineering, University of California, San Diego. Electrical and Computer Engineering Distinguished Lecture Series. Digital object made available by UC San Diego Library.

== See also ==
- Committee of 100 (United States)
- yttrium

== Additional sources ==
- Gleick, James (16 August 1987). "In the trenches of science". The New York Times.
- Hazen, Robert M. (1988). The breakthrough : the race for the superconductor. New York: Summit Books. ISBN 9780671658298..
- Matricon, Jean; Glashausser, Georges Waysand; translated by Charles (2003). The cold wars : a history of superconductivity. New Brunswick, N.J.: Rutgers University Press. ISBN 9780813532950.

Academic offices
Preceded by Woo Chia-wei	President of the Hong Kong University of Science and Technology; 2001–2009	Succeeded by Tony F. Chan
Preceded by	President of the Taiwan Comprehensive University System; 2012–	Succeeded by
