= University of Houston Physics Department =

Coordinates: 29.722765425583646°N 95.34497757366276°W

University of Houston Department of Physics
- Established: 1936
- Chair: Kevin E. Bassler
- Faculty: 36
- Undergraduates: 105
- Postgraduates: 8
- Doctoral students: 90
- Location: Houston, Texas, United States
- Website: phys.uh.edu

The Department of Physics at the University of Houston is an academic department in the University of Houston College of Natural Sciences and Mathematics. It conducts research in both fundamental and applied physics. Its listed research programs include applied physics and materials science; atomic, molecular and optical physics; biological and medical physics; condensed matter physics; particle physics; physics education research; quantum foundations; seismic physics; space physics; and statistical and nonlinear physics. Department faculty also participate in the university-wide UH Quantum Initiative, whose focus areas include quantum computing, quantum materials and devices, and quantum networks and communication. The department has significant faculty involvement in the Texas Center for Superconductivity at the University of Houston (TcSUH).

== Research ==
The department's research in condensed matter physics and materials physics includes superconductivity, quantum materials, strongly correlated systems, topological phases of matter, nonequilibrium quantum systems, nanostructured materials, and energy-related materials. Experimental work includes the synthesis and characterization of superconducting and other quantum materials, high-pressure and metastable phases, ion-beam techniques, and nanoscale materials. Theoretical research includes quantum many-body physics, quantum statistical mechanics, topological matter, unconventional superconductivity, and the use of classical and quantum computation to study correlated systems.

Particle and nuclear physics research includes relativistic heavy-ion collisions, quantum chromodynamics (QCD), the structure of protons and nuclei, and neutrino physics. Researchers study the quark–gluon plasma produced in high-energy nuclear collisions, the QCD phase diagram and strongly interacting matter under extreme conditions, and the quark and gluon structure of nucleons. Experimental groups participate in research at facilities including the Large Hadron Collider at CERN, the Relativistic Heavy Ion Collider at Brookhaven National Laboratory, Jefferson Lab, and neutrino experiments associated with Fermilab.

Research in biological and medical physics includes X-ray, optical, ultrasound and thermal imaging, inverse problems, computational imaging and biophysics. Statistical and nonlinear physics research includes nonequilibrium statistical mechanics, complex systems and networks, stochastic processes, and applications to biological and other complex systems.

The department also conducts research in space and planetary physics and in seismic physics. Planetary research includes observational, theoretical and numerical studies of planetary atmospheres using data from space missions, while seismic research includes wave propagation, inverse theory and subsurface imaging.

== Teaching ==
The department offers a Bachelor of Science degree in physics, possibly with a geophysics specialization, and a Bachelor of Arts degree in physics. In the near future there will also be a bachelor of science degree in computational physics. At the graduate level, the department offers a Master of Science and a Doctor of Philosophy in physics.

== Recognition and notable developments ==
In 2026, researchers in the Department of Physics and the Texas Center for Superconductivity at the University of Houston reported superconductivity at an ambient-pressure transition temperature of 151 K in HgBa_{2}Ca_{2}Cu_{3}O_{8+δ} using a pressure-quench technique. The result, published in the Proceedings of the National Academy of Sciences, exceeded the previously reported record for the superconducting transition temperature at ambient pressure. The result was subsequently covered by the American Physical Society and Physics World.

In 2025, members of the University of Houston group participating in ALICE at CERN were among the recipients of the Breakthrough Prize in Fundamental Physics. The 2025 prize recognized scientists from the ALICE, ATLAS, CMS, and LHCb collaborations for measurements made at the Large Hadron Collider, including studies of the strong interaction and matter produced under conditions resembling those of the early universe. Current and former University of Houston researchers associated with the ALICE group were included among the award recipients. In 2025, physics professor Donna Stokes also received a Presidential Award for Excellence in Science, Mathematics and Engineering Mentoring (PAESMEM), a national award recognizing mentoring in STEM fields. Stokes has been involved in physics education, student mentoring, and the university's teachHOUSTON STEM teacher-preparation program.

In 2024, condensed-matter physicist Zhifeng Ren, director of the Texas Center for Superconductivity at the University of Houston, was named one of the inaugural Big 12 Faculty of the Year award recipients. The conference recognized one faculty member from each member institution for contributions to research and innovation.

== History, achievements and notable faculty ==
=== History and notable achievements ===
By 1936, physics was among the scientific disciplines represented at the University of Houston. After the university became a state institution, the university approved doctoral programs in physics and chemistry in 1963. Physics faculty and students moved into the newly constructed Science and Research Building 1 in 1969, and the Department of Physics subsequently became part of the College of Natural Sciences and Mathematics when the college was established in the 1970s.

A major development in the department's history occurred in 1987, when Paul C. W. Chu and collaborators at Houston demonstrated superconductivity in a copper-oxide material at temperatures above the boiling point of liquid nitrogen. The work contributed to the rapid expansion of research in high-temperature superconductivity and led to the establishment of the Texas Center for Superconductivity at the University of Houston (TcSUH). Chu later received the National Medal of Science and was elected to the National Academy of Sciences.

In 1991, Science identified the University of Houston physics department as one of ten influential physics programs in the United States.

The department also became involved in space-based materials research through the Wake Shield Facility, developed at the University of Houston's Space Vacuum Epitaxy Center. The facility first flew aboard Space Shuttle Discovery in 1994 and was designed to use the ultra-high vacuum created behind an orbiting platform for semiconductor thin-film growth.

In 2014, the Institute of Electrical and Electronics Engineers designated the University of Houston an IEEE Milestone site for the 1987 discovery of high-temperature superconductivity above 77 K.

In 2025, current and former members of the department's group in the ALICE collaboration at CERN were among the researchers recognized by the Breakthrough Prize in Fundamental Physics. The prize honored the ALICE, ATLAS, CMS, and LHCb collaborations for results from the Large Hadron Collider, including studies of strongly interacting matter and extreme conditions in the early universe.

In 2026, researchers from the department and TcSUH reported superconductivity with a transition temperature of 151 K at ambient pressure in pressure-quenched HgBa_{2}Ca_{2}Cu_{3}O_{8+δ}. The result represented the highest reported superconducting transition temperature at ambient pressure at the time.

=== Notable faculty ===
- Paul C. W. Chu – experimental condensed-matter physicist known for work on high-temperature superconductivity. He joined the University of Houston in 1979 and founded the Texas Center for Superconductivity. His honors include the National Medal of Science and election to the National Academy of Sciences.
- Alex Ignatiev – physicist and materials scientist who directed NASA-supported research centers at UH and served as principal investigator of the Wake Shield Facility program, which flew on three Space Shuttle missions.
- Arthur Weglein – theoretical physicist known for research in inverse scattering and seismic imaging. He directs the Mission-Oriented Seismic Research Program and received the Society of Exploration Geophysicists' Maurice Ewing Medal in 2016.
- Simon C. Moss – condensed-matter and materials physicist who joined the department in 1972. His honors included the American Physical Society's David Adler Lectureship Award and the Max Planck Research Award.
- Zhifeng Ren – condensed-matter physicist and director of TcSUH whose research includes thermoelectric materials, superconductivity and nanomaterials. His honors include the Humboldt Research Award, fellowship in several scientific societies, and the University of Houston's Esther Farfel Award.
