= Matthias rules =

Physical laws about superconductivity

In physics, the Matthias rules refers to a historical set of empirical guidelines on how to find superconductors. These rules were authored Bernd T. Matthias who discovered hundreds of superconductors using these principles in the 1950s and 1960s. Deviations from these rules have been found since the end of the 1970s with the discovery of unconventional superconductors.

== History ==
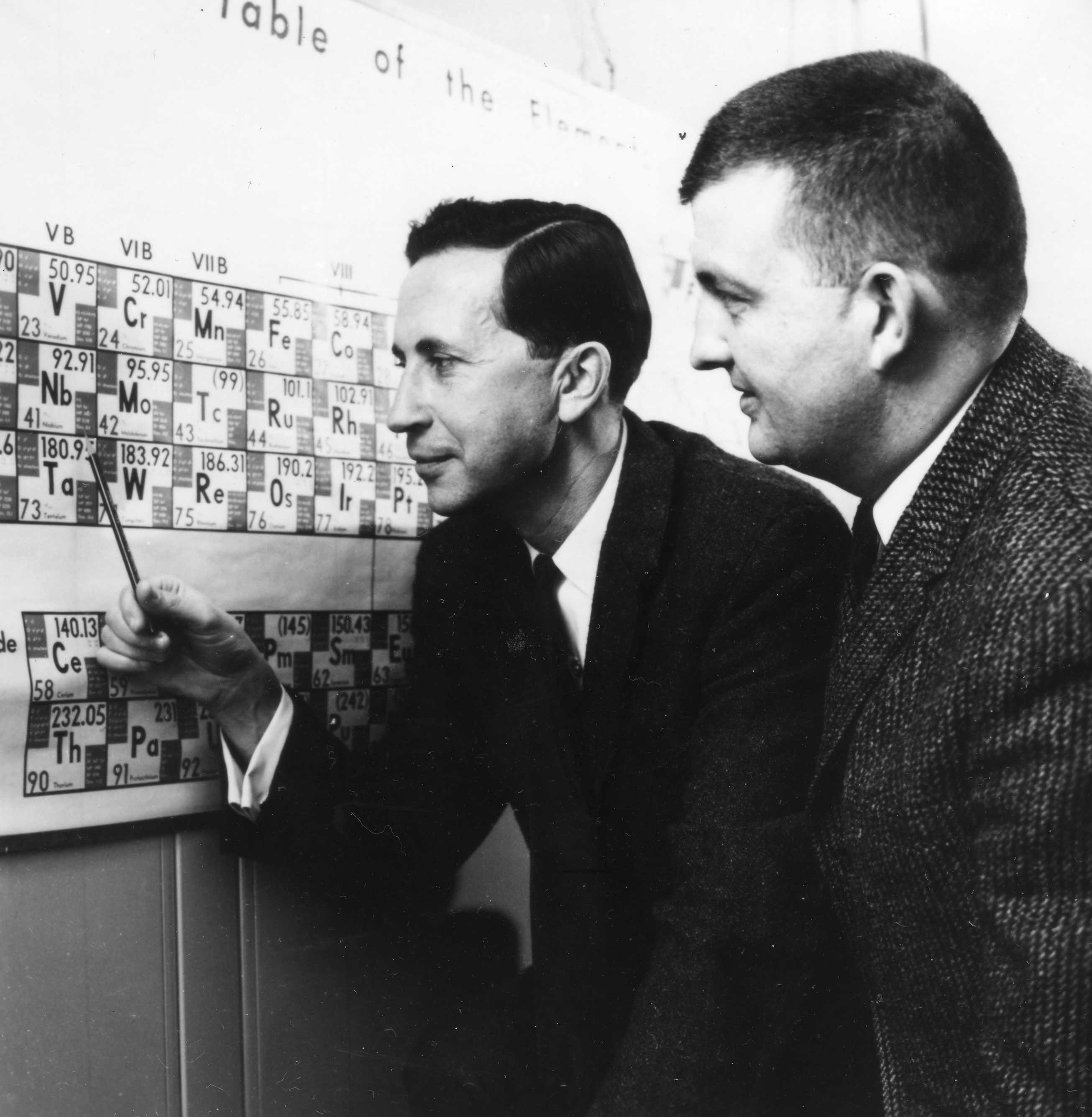
Bernd T. Matthias (left) points to the element niobium on the periodic table while John Eugene Kunzler looks on. After reporting to the American Physical Society that a ductile alloy of niobium and zirconium will remain superconducting at liquid helium temperature.

Superconductivity was first discovered in solid mercury in 1911 by Heike Kamerlingh Onnes and Gilles Holst, who had developed new techniques to reach near-absolute zero temperatures.

In subsequent decades, superconductivity was found in several other materials; In 1913, lead at 7 K, in 1930's niobium at 10 K, and in 1941 niobium nitride at 16 K.

In 1933, Walther Meissner and Robert Ochsenfeld discovered that superconductors expelled applied magnetic fields, a phenomenon that has come to be known as the Meissner effect.

Bernd T. Matthias and John Kenneth Hulm were encouraged by Enrico Fermi to start a systematic experimental investigation in the 1950s, looking for superconductors in different elements and compounds. For this reason, they developed a technique based on the Meissner effect.

In collaboration with Theodore H. Geballe, Matthias broke the record in 1954, with the discovery of superconductivity in niobium–tin (Nb_{3}Sn) which had the highest known transition temperature of about 18 K. Later Matthias would try to come up with general empirical properties to find superconducting alloys. In the same year he published a first version of his famous guidelines which came to be known, as the "Mathias rules". Matthias was able to show in 1962 that some deviations from his rules where due to impurities or defects in the materials. Using his rules, Matthias and collaborators found in 1965 that niobium–germanium (Nb_{3}Ge) with a record critical temperature above 20 K.

Matthias published a first outline his rules in 1957. A successful microscopic theory of superconductivity would no come up until the same year, with the development of the BCS theory by John Bardeen, Leon Cooper, and John Robert Schrieffer.

Geballe and Matthias won the Oliver E. Buckley Condensed Matter Prize in 1970 for "For their joint experimental investigations of superconductivity which have challenged theoretical understanding and opened up the technology of high field superconductors."

One of the first deviations of Matthias' rules was found with the discovery of superconductivity in molybdenum sulfide and selenides. Matthias postulated an additional criterion in 1976 at the Rochester Conference on superconductivity to include these materials.

Another violation of Matthias rules appeared in 1979, with the discovery of heavy fermion superconductors by Frank Steglich where magnetism was expected to play a role, contrary to the Matthias rules.

Matthias held the record of highest critical temperature superconductor found until the discovery of high-temperature superconductors were discovered in 1986 by Georg Bednorz and K. Alex Müller.

== Description ==
The Matthias rules are a set of guidelines to find low temperature superconductors but were never provided in list form by Matthias.

A popular summarized version of these rules reads:

1. High symmetry is good, cubic symmetry is the best.
2. High density of electronic states is good.
3. Stay away from oxygen.
4. Stay away from magnetism
5. Stay away from insulators.
6. Stay away from theorists!

Rule 2, rules out materials near metal-insulator transition like oxides. Rule 4, rules out material that are in close vicinity to ferromagnetism or antiferromagnetism. Rule 6 is not an official rule and is often added to indicate skepticism of the theories of the time.

Other equivalent principles as stated by Matthias, indicate to work mainly with d-electron metals; with the average number of valence electrons, preferably odd numbers 3, 5, and 7 and high electron density or high electron density of state at the Fermi level.

In 1976, Mattias added the criterion to include "elements which will not react at all with molybdenum alone form superconducting compounds with Mo_{3}S_{4} and Mo_{3}Se_{4}, S or Se" due to deviations in molybdenum compounds.

== Failure and extensions ==
It has been argued that all of Matthias' rules have been shown to not be completely valid. Specially the rules are not valid for high-temperature superconductors, alternative rules for these materials have been suggested.
