= Jerry Woodall =

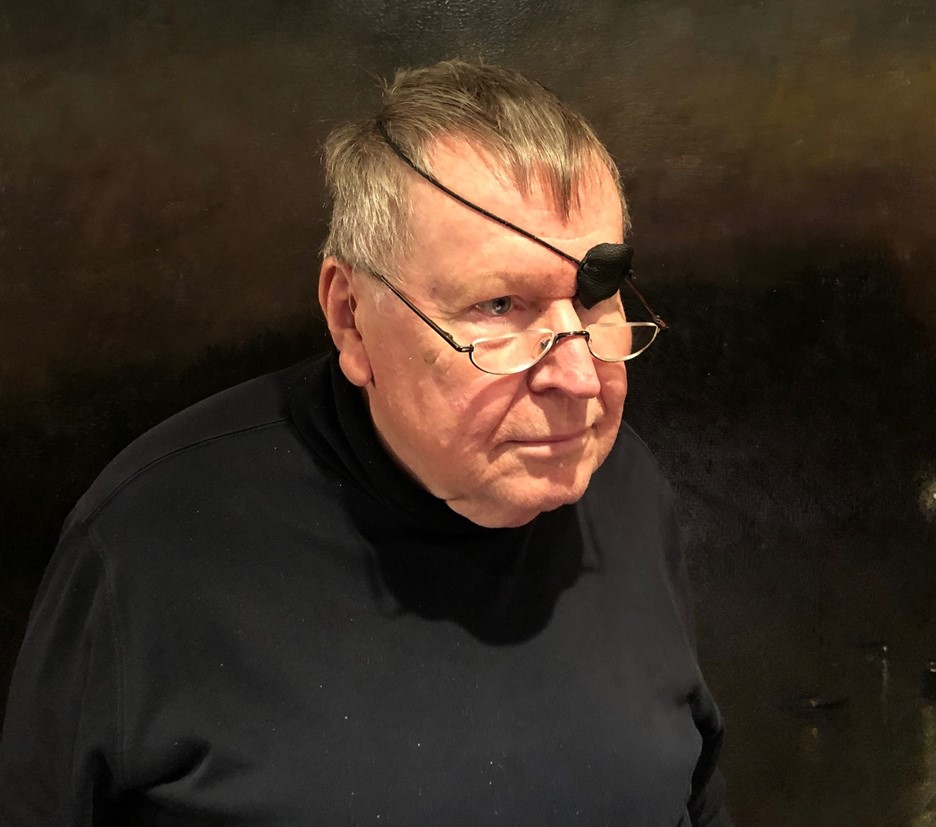
- Born: September 5, 1938 (age 88); Takoma Park, Maryland, United States
- Occupations: Inventor, Scientist, Professor

Academic background
- Education: Metallurgy, Electrical Engineering, Microelectronics
- Alma mater: Massachusetts Institute of Technology; Cornell University
- Website: woodall.ece.ucdavis.edu

Jerry M. Woodall is a professor of electrical and computer engineering at the University of California, Davis who is widely known for his revolutionary work on LEDs and semiconductors. Over the course of his career, he has published close to 400 scientific articles and his work has directly contributed to the development of major technologies that are used around the world, such as TVs, optical fibers, and mobile phones. Woodall currently holds over 80 U.S. patents for a variety of inventions and has received prestigious awards from IBM, NASA, and the U.S. president for his contributions to science, technology, and humanity.

== Education and early life ==
Jerry Woodall was born in Takoma Park, Maryland in 1938, which is located in Washington DC. His father was a plastering contractor, his mother a homemaker, and he had three siblings: one older brother and two half sisters. He went to a Seventh Day Adventist grade school, and Takoma Academy for high school.

Although he flunked his "Electricity and Magnetism" course at the Massachusetts Institute of Technology, Woodall managed to graduate with a C average and receive a BS in Metallurgy (minor in Psychology) in 1960. He then worked as a Staff Engineer at Clevite Transistor Products in Waltham, MA for two years. In 1962, he became a research staff member at IBM's Thomas J. Watson Research Center, where he worked most of his life, and was appointed Corporate IBM Fellow in 1985. At the same time, he obtained his PhD in electrical engineering from Cornell University in 1982.

Woodall then made a shift in his life to focus on academic work. In 1993, he became a professor at Purdue University and taught microelectronics. He also taught electrical engineering at Yale University from 1999 to 2004, but he returned to Purdue in 2005. In 2012, he moved to UC Davis to teach Electrical & Computer Engineering.

== Research ==
Woodall's research is largely focused on developing novel electronic materials and microelectronic devices that can greatly impact society. While at IBM, Woodall developed a highly efficient LED using the liquid phase epitaxy (LPE) method that continues to form the foundation of LED research. Shortly after, he built upon this work by developing high-speed electronic and photonic devices, including the first super bright red LED and a novel, high-efficiency solar cell. Woodall's work on LEDs has therefore been essential for the development of a wide variety of consumer products. This includes remotes, TVs, and LAN devices that utilize IR LEDs, as well as CD players and optical fibers that utilize super-bright red LEDs. Woodall is also referred to as the "father of heterojunction devices" due to his seminal work inventing and developing the modern implementations of heterojunction bipolar transistors (HBT) and pseudomorphic high electron mobility transistors (P-HEMT). Due to their compact size and high speed, these transistors are now used worldwide in many personal electronic devices, including most tablets and mobile phones on the market.

More recently, Woodall's lab has been focused on finding more efficient and environmentally friendly ways of supplying the worlds growing energy demands. His lab has designed a hybrid solar power conversion system that can operate at moderate temperatures without the need for traditional cooling systems. This design has the potential to reduce the cost of building these systems while also making them more efficient and thermal stable, thus solving some of the major issues limiting the scalability of solar energy production. In addition, Woodall's lab has also been researching methods that attempt to increase the feasibility of using hydrogen as an alternative energy source. Specifically, his lab has been developing new methods of producing hydrogen on-demand and finding ways to safely store and transport it so it can be used as a new source of renewable energy.

== Contributions to science ==
Jerry Woodall is an American inventor and scientist best known for his invention of the first commercially viable heterojunction material GaAlAs for red LEDs used in automobile brake lights and traffic lights, CD and DVD players, TV remote controls and computer networks. He is a recipient of US National Medal of Technology and Innovation for "his pioneering role in the research and development of compound semiconductor materials and devices..."

He was elected to National Academy of Engineering (NAE) in 1989, and Honorary Member of The Electrochemical Society (ECS) in 2007. He is also the fellow of American Vacuum Society (AVS), Institute of Electrical and Electronics Engineers (IEEE) and American Physical Society (APS).

Recently, Woodall gave a lecture at Massachusetts Institute of Technology (MIT) outlining his current contributions to the field of renewable energy and energy storage. In this lecture, titled "Electricity Produced by Intermittent Power Requires Its Energy Storage", he highlights the need for better methods of storing energy if the world is to use intermittent renewable energy sources like solar and wind. The main issues with current energy storage methods are that they waste energy, raise Earth's temperature, and can't reliably store and release useful amounts of energy during periods of low energy production. Woodall therefore presents his ongoing research developing a system that can not only reliably capture, store, and release intermittent energy, but also produce potable water on-demand in the process. His work continues to greatly contribute to science and renewable energy research, and will be crucial as the world transitions to intermittent energy sources in the future.

== Awards and honors ==
- R&D 100 Award (1975)
- Electronics Division Award of the Electrochemical Society (1980)
- American Physical Society (APS) Fellow (1982)
- IEEE Jack A. Morton Award (1984)
- Electrochemical Society - Gordon E. Moore Medal for Outstanding Achievement in Solid State Science and Technology (1985)
- Gallium Arsenide Symposium Award and Heinrich Welker Gold Medal (1988)
- National Academy of Engineering (NAE) Member (1989)
- American Vacuum Society Founders Medal and Award - Welch Award (1990)
- Institute of Electrical and Electronics Engineers (IEEE) Fellow (1990)
- Electrochemical Society (ECS) Fellow (1992)
- American Vacuum Society (AVS) Fellow (1994)
- Eta Kappa Nu Vladimir Karapetoff Eminent Member's Award (1997)
- Acheson Award from the Electrochemical Society (1998)
- ASEE General Electric Senior Research Award (1998)
- IEEE Electron Devices Society (EDS) Millennium Medal (2000)
- National Medal of Technology (2001)
- The FMS National Materials Advancement Award (2002)
- IEEE Jun-ichi Nishizawa Medal (2005)
- National Academy of Inventors Fellow (2013)
- American Association for the Advancement of Science (AAAS) Fellow (2018)
