= Eugene E. Haller =

American physicist (1943–2018)

- Born: January 5, 1943; Basel, Switzerland
- Died: June 22, 2018 (aged 75)
- Education: University of Basel
- Scientific career
- Workplaces: University of California, Berkeley; Lawrence Berkeley National Laboratory

Eugene Ernest Haller (January 5, 1943 – June 22, 2018) was a Swiss-American physicist and materials scientist.

== Early life and career ==
Haller studied physics at the University of Basel and graduated in 1967 with a thesis in nuclear physics. In 1970, he received his doctorate with a thesis in solid-state physics and applied physics. In the same year, he moved to the Lawrence Berkeley National Laboratory in Berkeley, initially on a three-year scholarship from the Swiss National Science Foundation and subsequently as a research assistant. In 1980, he was appointed associate professor at the University of California, Berkeley, and two years later he was promoted to full professor. He remained there until his retirement in 2011, while also working as a senior scientist at Lawrence Berkeley National Laboratory. Since 2005, he had held the Liao-Cho Innovation Endowed Chair at UC Berkeley.

== Research ==
With his research into the synthesis of high-purity and doped crystals, Haller made contributions to improving the quality of semiconductors. His advances in the growth of semiconductor crystals led to the production of germanium of unprecedented purity. This formed the basis for one of the three scientific instruments (Multiband Imaging Photometer) on the Spitzer Space Telescope, launched in 2003. Haller also demonstrated the significant influence of hydrogen on semiconductors and was one of the first to recognize the potential of isotopes in semiconductor manufacturing.

In 1984, he founded the Electronic Materials Program at Lawrence Berkeley National Laboratory, a program funded by the United States Department of Energy that continues to this day. In 1986, he spent a research stay at the Max Planck Institute for Solid State Research in Stuttgart.

== Personal life ==
He was married to his wife Marianne and was the father of two daughters, Isabelle and Nicole. In his private life, he collected historic radios and owned a 1939 Talbot Lago T23 classic car.

== Awards and honors ==
- 1985: Humboldt Research Award for Scientists from the U.S.
- 1986: Fellow of the American Physical Society (APS)
- 1990: Miller Research Professorship
- 1994: Max Planck Research Award
- 1999: James C. McGroddy Prize for New Materials from the American Physical Society
- 2001: Miller Research Professorship
- 2004: Member of the American Association for the Advancement of Science (AAAS)
- 2005: David Turnbull Lectureship from the Materials Research Society
- 2010: FMD John Bardeen Award of The Minerals, Metals & Materials Society
- 2010: Member of the National Academy of Engineering
