= Kenji Watanabe (scientist) =

Japanese scientist

- Born: 渡邊賢司; August 8, 1962 (age 64); Fujiyoshida, Yamanashi Prefecture, Japan
- Education: Shizuoka University; Hokkaido University
- Known for: High-purity hexagonal boron nitride (h-BN)
- Awards: Clarivate Citation Laureates (2022); James C. McGroddy Prize for New Materials (2023); Asahi Prize (2024)
- Scientific career
- Fields: Materials science
- Workplaces: National Institute for Materials Science

Kenji Watanabe (渡邊賢司, Watanabe Kenji; born August 8, 1962) is a Japanese material scientist. He is a Specially Appointed Researcher at the National Institute for Materials Science (NIMS).

== Early life and education ==
Watanabe was born in Fujiyoshida, Yamanashi Prefecture. He graduated from the Faculty of Science at Shizuoka University in 1985. After received a Doctor of Science degree from the Graduate School of Science, Hokkaido University in 1990, he joined Oki Electric Industry Co., Ltd.

== NIMS ==
Since 1994, Watanabe has been affiliated with the former National Institute for Research in Inorganic Materials (NIRIM), which is now part of the National Institute for Materials Science (NIMS).

He served as a Principal Researcher in the Electronic Ceramics Group, Electronic and Electrical Functional Materials Field, Functional Materials Research Center at NIMS. In 2023, he became a Specially Appointed Researcher at the Electronic and Photonic Functional Materials Research Center of NIMS and also a Visiting Researcher in the Semiconductor Defect Control Group, Optical Materials Field, within the same center.

His specialty is semiconductor physics and engineering, and he has been collaborating with Takashi Taniguchi on the development of high-purity hexagonal boron nitride (h-BN) technology.

== Awards and honors ==
- 2017 – MEXT Commendation for Science and Technology (Research Category)
- 2022 – Clarivate Citation Laureates
- 2023 – James C. McGroddy Prize for New Materials
- 2023 – Ichimura Academic Award
- 2023 – Ibaraki Prefecture Special Meritorious Service Award
- 2024 – Asahi Prize
- 2024 – Tsukuba Prize
