= Takashi Taniguchi (scientist) =

Japanese scientist (born 1959)

- Born: 谷口尚; July 11, 1959 (age 67); Tokyo, Japan
- Education: Tokyo University of Agriculture and Technology; Tokyo Institute of Technology
- Known for: High-purity hexagonal boron nitride (h-BN)
- Awards: Clarivate Citation Laureates (2022); James C. McGroddy Prize for New Materials (2023); Asahi Prize (2024); Medal with Purple Ribbon (2025)
- Scientific career
- Fields: Materials science
- Workplaces: National Institute for Materials Science; Tohoku University; University of Tokyo; University of London

Takashi Taniguchi (谷口尚, Taniguchi Takashi; born July 11, 1959) is a Japanese material scientist. He is a fellow and the Director of the International Center for Materials Nanoarchitectonics at the National Institute for Materials Science (NIMS). He is also a former President of the High Pressure Science Society of Japan.

Taniguchi is an expert in crystal growth and has published numerous co-authored papers with Kenji Watanabe and others. Their laboratory is the primary source of high-quality hexagonal boron nitride (h-BN) crystals, used widely as a substrate for various two-dimensional materials, such as graphene and transition metal dichalcogenide monolayers. He was featured in Nature as one of the “most prolific researchers.”.

== Early life and education ==
Taniguchi was born in Tokyo. He graduated from the Department of Industrial Chemistry at Tokyo University of Agriculture and Technology in 1982. He obtained a master's degree in materials science in 1984 and a Doctor of Engineering degree in 1987, both from Tokyo Tech (now the Institute of Science Tokyo).

== Career ==
In 1987, Taniguchi began his research career as a Research Associate at the Research Laboratory of Engineering Materials at Tokyo Institute of Technology (Tokyo Tech). In the same year, he was appointed assistant professor in the Department of Inorganic Materials at Tokyo Tech.

In 1989, he became Senior Research Officer at the Ultra-High Pressure Station of the National Institute for Research in Inorganic Materials (NIRIM), formerly under the Science and Technology Agency. In 1994, he served as a visiting researcher at the Department of Earth and Planetary Sciences, University of London.

He served as President of the High Pressure Science Society of Japan in 2015, and as Vice President of the International Association for the Advancement of High Pressure Science and Technology (AIRAPT) in 2019.

He has also served as an Affiliated Professor at the Graduate School of Science, Tohoku University, and as a visiting professor at the Institute of Industrial Science, The University of Tokyo.

=== National Institute for Materials Science ===
In 2001, he was appointed Senior Researcher at the Ultra-High Pressure Station of the Materials Research Institute at the National Institute for Materials Science. In 2006, he became Group Leader of the Ultra-High Pressure Group in the Nano Materials Laboratory at NIMS.

In 2020, he was appointed Fellow of NIMS. In 2021, he became Director of the International Center for Materials Nanoarchitectonics at NIMS. In 2022, he served as Special Advisor to the President of NIMS, and in 2023, he was appointed Director of NIMS.

== Awards and honors ==
- 2016 – Thomson Reuters Research Front Award
- 2017 – Minister of Education, Culture, Sports, Science and Technology Commendation for Science and Technology (Research Category)
- 2017 – Highly cited researcher Clarivate Analysis
- 2018 – Highly cited researcher Clarivate Analysis
- 2018 – High Pressure Science Society of Japan Award
- 2019 – Ceramic Society of Japan Award
- 2022 – Clarivate Citation Laureates
- 2023 – James C. McGroddy Prize for New Materials
- 2023 – Ichimura Academic Award
- 2023 – Ibaraki Prefecture Special Meritorious Service Award
- 2024 – Asahi Prize
- 2024 – Tsukuba Prize
- 2025 – Medal with Purple Ribbon, from the Government of Japan
- 2026 – GLOBAL GRAPHENE & 2D CARBON LAUREATE • 2026
