= Paul C. Canfield =

American physicist

Paul C. Canfield is an American physicist.

Canfield earned his Bachelor of Science in physics from the University of Virginia in 1983, and his Master's of Science and PhD at the University of California, Los Angeles. He pursued postdoctoral research with Joe David Thompson and Zachary Fisk of Los Alamos National Laboratory until 1993. Canfield subsequently joined Ames Laboratory and Iowa State University, where he holds the Robert Allen Wright Professorship, a distinguished professorship, and the rank of senior scientist.

The American Physical Society has awarded Canfield fellowship (2001), the David Adler Lectureship Award (2014), and the James C. McGroddy Prize (2017). He is a 2011 recipient of the Ernest Orlando Lawrence Award. In 2015, Canfield received funding from the Alexander von Humboldt Research Award Programme. Canfield is a 2020 member of the American Academy of Arts and Sciences.
