= David J. Lockwood =

New Zealand-Canadian physicist

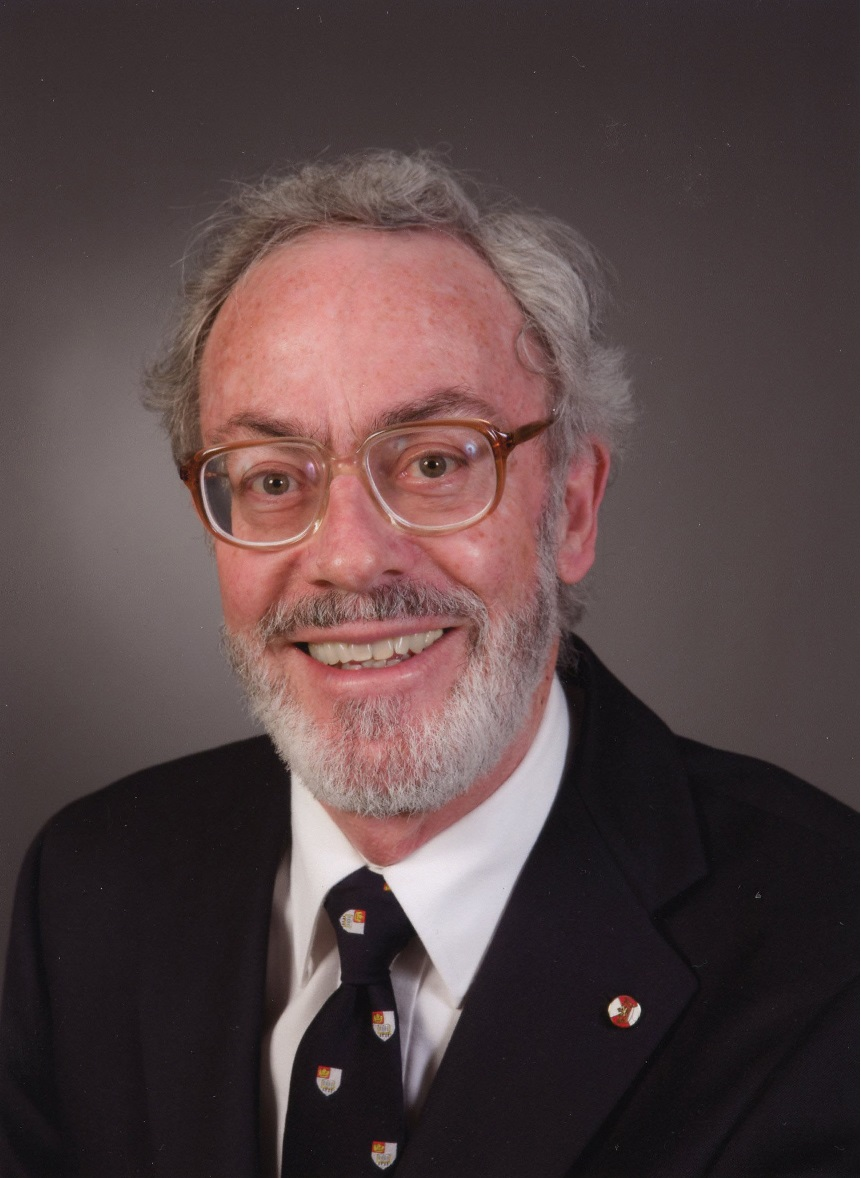
- Born: Christchurch, New Zealand
- Citizenship: Canadian, New Zealand
- Education: University of Canterbury, University of Edinburgh
- Known for: Optical properties of semiconductor nanostructures
- Awards: Brockhouse Medal (2005); Henry Marshall Tory Medal (2005); CAP Lifetime Achievement in Physics Medal (2013); Gordon E. Moore Medal for Outstanding Achievement in Solid State Science and Technology (2018)
- Scientific career
- Fields: Condensed Matter Physics
- Workplaces: University of Waterloo, National Research Council of Canada
- Thesis: Light scattering spectroscopy: studies of electronic excitations and atomic vibrations in matter (1978)
- Doctoral advisor: Alister George McLellan

David J. Lockwood is a Canadian physicist and researcher emeritus at the National Research Council of Canada (NRC). He is also an adjunct professor at the University of Windsor in Windsor, Ontario, editor of the journal Solid State Communications, editor of the Springer book series "Topics in Applied Physics", and secretary-treasurer of the Canadian Association of Physicists. Lockwood is a Fellow of the Royal Society of Canada, the American Physical Society, the Electrochemical Society, and the Institute of Physics.

== Early life ==
Lockwood was inspired to pursue physics at an early age by his Christchurch Boys' High School teacher, Henry (Swanny) Dyer. He subsequently completed a B.Sc. (1964), M.Sc. (1966) and Ph.D. (1969) in Physics at the University of Canterbury in Christchurch, New Zealand. His doctoral work, under Professor Alister McLellan, focused on Raman scattering from insulators.

== Academic career ==
Between 1970 and 1971, Lockwood undertook post-doctoral research at the University of Waterloo with Professor Donald Irish, where he investigated the vibrational spectroscopy of solvated cations. He then spent six years as a research fellow at Edinburgh University, looking at the dynamical properties of structural phase transitions and antiferromagnets. These studies culminated in a DSc degree in physics from Edinburgh University in 1978.

== Research ==
In 1978, Lockwood moved to Canada to work at the National Research Council (NRC), where his continued work on magnetic materials led to the publication of what would become a seminal book in the field, Light Scattering in Magnetic Solids, co-written with Michael Cottam. He turned his attention to the optical properties of superlattices, semiconductor heterostructures, and nanostructures, publishing some 600 papers and 39 books, as well as registering six US patents. Lockwood has edited numerous scientific volumes, notably the Nanostructure Science and Technology series, and served on the editorial boards of several journals, such as Low Temperature Physics, Physica E, and Physics in Canada. He has organised international conferences and served on over 50 committees, including within NATO and IUPAP. In 2016, Lockwood retired from the NRC. In July 2016, he was invested with the title of NRC Researcher Emeritus.

== Honours ==
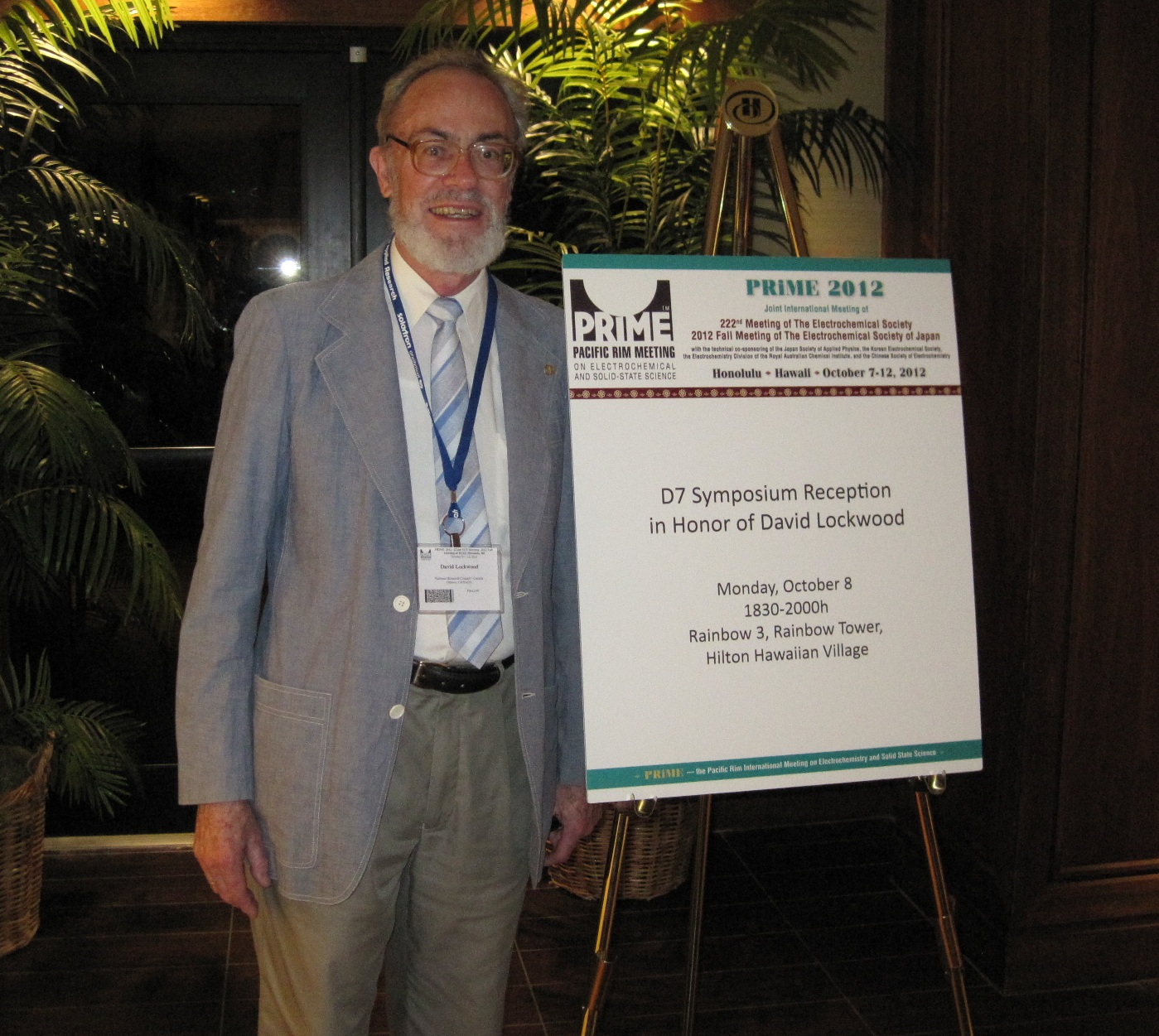
2012 Symposium

Lockwood has garnered significant recognition for his work, including the Canadian Association of Physicists' (CAP) Brockhouse Medal and the Royal Society of Canada's Tory Medal, each awarded in 2005.

In 2010 the Electrochemical Society granted him the Centennial Outstanding Achievement Award, and in 2011 he received the Lifetime Achievement Award of the Canadian Semiconductor Science and Technology Conference "in recognition of over 40 years of outstanding contributions to the generation and dissemination of knowledge related to materials science as revealed by optical spectroscopy".

A symposium in honour of David Lockwood was held at the 2012 Pacific Rim Meeting on Electrochemical and Solid State Science (PRIME 2012). In February 2013, Lockwood was granted the Queen Elizabeth II Diamond Jubilee Medal, which recognised significant achievements by Canadians in honour of the Queen's Jubilee. Also in 2013, Lockwood was awarded the CAP Medal for Lifetime Achievement in Physics, the highest honour that a Canadian physicist can receive. In February 2015, Lockwood was made a Fellow of the Institute of Physics of the UK.

Lockwood was the 2019 recipient of the Gordon E. Moore Medal for Outstanding Achievement in Solid State Science and Technology. Lockwood was recognised for outstanding original contributions to the elucidation of the role of quantum-confinement effects in the optical and electrochemical properties of semiconductor nanostructures with applications in optoelectronics and photonics.

In 2022, Lockwood received an Honorable Mention in the IUPAP 100 Photo Contest under the category "At a Glance". In the photograph, Lockwood is seen aligning a laser beam from an argon ion laser for a Raman scattering experiment. The photo was also displayed outside UNESCO headquarters in Paris, and on the cover of the UNESCO publication commemorating the International Year of Basic Sciences.

In recognition of his extensive publication record in materials science, Lockwood ranked 99th in Canada in Research.com's 2023 Ranking of Best Scientists in this field, based on a D-index (Discipline H-index) metric.
