= John R. Arthur Jr. =

American materials scientist

John R. Arthur Jr. is an American materials scientist best known as a pioneer of molecular beam epitaxy.

Together with Alfred Y. Cho, Arthur pioneered molecular beam epitaxy at Bell Laboratories, where he published a paper in July 1968 that described construction of epitaxial gallium arsenide layers using molecular beam epitaxy. They received the 1982 IEEE Morris N. Liebmann Memorial Award "for the development and application of molecular beam epitaxy technology," and the 1982 James C. McGroddy Prize for New Materials from the American Physical Society.

== Selected works ==
- Arthur Jr., J. R., J. Appl. Phys. 39, 4032–4034 (1968).
- Cho, A. Y.; J. R. Arthur Jr. “Molecular beam epitaxy”. Prog. Solid State Chem., 10: 157–192. (1975).
