= Herbert Maxwell Strong =

American physicist and inventor

Herbert Maxwell Strong (September 30, 1908, Wooster, Ohio – January 30, 2002, Schenectady, New York) was an American physicist and inventor, known as part of the General Electric (GE) team of researchers who synthesized diamonds in late 1954, as announced by GE in early 1955.

== Education and career ==
Herbert M. Strong graduated in 1930 with a B.S. from the University of Toledo. At Ohio State University he was a graduate student in physics and graduated in 1931 with an M.S. and in 1936 with a Ph.D. His doctoral adviser was Harold Paul Knauss (1900–1963), who was the author of the 1951 textbook Discovering Physics. Strong was employed in Chicago by the Kendall Company, where he worked on the physics and chemistry of adhesives. In 1946 he became a research associate at the General Electric Research Laboratory in Schenectady, New York, where he worked until he retired in 1973.

At GE, he worked on "the hot supersonic exhaust flames from rocket motors on test stands." His next major project was research on heat transfer and the "development of a thin, evacuated, flat-panel thermal insulation for use in refrigerators, freezers, and other cooling devices."

The third and most important project that Strong and his colleagues at GE undertook, beginning in 1952, was to find ways to synthesize diamond from baser forms of carbon under physical–chemical conditions in the thermodynamic region of stability for diamond. The basis guiding the experimental work was thermodynamic theory; this was new, unknown territory experimentally. Success—the reproducible synthesis of diamond in the GE lab with a “fair” understanding of the process—came in early 1955, and Strong’s name appears on the first patent and publications of the results. GE began marketing Man-Made™ industrial-grade diamond abrasive in 1957. ... In 1969–70, Strong perfected methods for growing large, single-crystal, high-quality diamonds—some more perfect in the crystallographic and purity sense than the best of natural diamonds. Those achievements made it possible to experimentally investigate various properties—such as electrical and optical properties, heat conduction, and isotope effects—of nearly perfect diamond crystals.

Strong is credited with 23 U.S. patents. In 1977 he, along with Francis P. Bundy, H. Tracy Hall, and Robert H. Wentorf Jr., received the International Prize for New Materials, now called the James C. McGroddy Prize for New Materials, for "their outstanding research contributions and inventions which include the first reproducible process for making diamond; the synthesis of cubic boron nitride; and the development of the high pressure processes that are required to produce these materials."

In retirement, Strong, with other local physicists, participated in a program sponsored by Schenectady's Museum of Innovation and Science. The program enabled schoolchildren to participate "in simple demonstrations of gravity, optics, magnetism, conservation of momentum, and other basic physical phenomena."

== Selected publications ==
- Strong, H. M.; Bundy, F. P. (1959). "Fusion Curves of Four Group VIII Metals to 100 000 Atmospheres". Physical Review. 115 (2): 278–284. Bibcode:1959PhRv..115..278S. doi:10.1103/PhysRev.115.278.
- Bundy, F. P.; Bovenkerk, H. P.; Strong, H. M.; Wentorf, R. H. (1961). "Diamond-Graphite Equilibrium Line from Growth and Graphitization of Diamond". The Journal of Chemical Physics. 35 (2): 383–391. Bibcode:1961JChPh..35..383B. doi:10.1063/1.1731938.
- Bundy, F.P.; Strong, H.M. (1962). Behavior of Metals at High Temperatures and Pressures. Solid State Physics. Vol. 13. pp. 81–146. doi:10.1016/S0081-1947(08)60456-7. ISBN 9780126077131.
- Strong, H. M. (1963). "Catalytic Effects in the Transformation of Graphite to Diamond". The Journal of Chemical Physics. 39 (8): 2057–2062. Bibcode:1963JChPh..39.2057S. doi:10.1063/1.1734582.
- Hanneman, R. E.; Strong, H. M. (1965). "Pressure Dependence of the emf of Thermocouples to 1300°C and 50 kbar". Journal of Applied Physics. 36 (2): 523–528. Bibcode:1965JAP....36..523H. doi:10.1063/1.1714023.
- Hanneman, R. E.; Strong, H. M.; Bundy, F. P. (1967). "Hexagonal Diamonds in Meteorites: Implications". Science. 155 (3765): 995–997. Bibcode:1967Sci...155..995H. doi:10.1126/science.155.3765.995. PMID 17830485. S2CID 31626060.
- Strong, H. M.; Hanneman, R. E. (1967). "Crystallization of Diamond and Graphite". The Journal of Chemical Physics. 46 (9): 3668–3676. Bibcode:1967JChPh..46.3668S. doi:10.1063/1.1841272.
- Strong, H. M.; Chrenko, R. M. (1971). "Diamond growth rates and physical properties of laboratory-made diamond". The Journal of Physical Chemistry. 75 (12): 1838–1843. doi:10.1021/j100681a014.
- Chrenko, R. M.; Strong, H. M.; Tuft, R. E. (1971). "Dispersed paramagnetic nitrogen content of large laboratory diamonds". Philosophical Magazine. 23 (182): 313–318. Bibcode:1971PMag...23..313C. doi:10.1080/14786437108216387.
- Strong, H. M.; Wentorf, R. H. (1972). "The growth of large diamond crystals". Naturwissenschaften. 59 (1): 1–7. Bibcode:1972NW.....59....1S. doi:10.1007/BF00594616. S2CID 11905774.
- Strong, H. M.; Tuft, R. E.; Hanneman, R. E. (1973). "The iron fusion curve and γ-δ-l triple point". Metallurgical Transactions. 4 (11): 2657–2661. Bibcode:1973MT......4.2657S. doi:10.1007/BF02644272. S2CID 97862290.
