= Gordon E. Moore Medal for Outstanding Achievement in Solid State Science and Technology =

ECS Gordon E. Moore Medal
- Awarded for: to recognize individuals distinguished for outstanding contributions to solid-state science and technology.
- Presented by: Electrochemical Society
- First award: 1971
- Website: ECS Gordon E. Moore Medal

The Gordon E. Moore Medal for Outstanding Achievement in Solid State Science and Technology (formerly the Solid-State Science and Technology Award) was established by The Electrochemical Society in 1971 to recognize individuals distinguished for outstanding contributions to solid-state science and technology. The award is presented every two years, and recipients receive a silver medal, wall plaque, cash prize, Society Life membership, and a complimentary meeting registration.

== History ==
Despite the fact that the solid-state community represented a major force in The Electrochemical Society, there was no form of recognition at the Society level of achievements in the field prior to the establishment of this award. Known as the Solid-State Science and Technology Award until 2005, the award was then renamed after Intel co-founder and author of Moore's Law, Gordon E. Moore, who is a long-time member of The Electrochemical Society.

== Notable Recipients ==
As listed by ECS:

- 2023 Fred Roozeboom
- 2021 Hiroshi Iwai
- 2019 David J. Lockwood
- 2015 Yue Kuo
- 2005 Dennis Hess
- 1999 Isamu Akasaki
- 1995 Wayne L. Worrell
- 1993 Bruce E. Deal
- 1987 Alfred Y. Cho
- 1985 Jerry M. Woodall
- 1983 Nick Holonyak, Jr.
- 1981 Gerald L. Pearson
- 1979 Morton B. Panish
- 1977 Robert N. Hall
- 1973 William G. Pfann

== See also ==
- List of chemistry awards
