= Bernard Raveau =

French researcher in materials science

Bernard Raveau (born in 1940), is a French researcher in materials science, professor emeritus at the University of Caen Normandy, member of the French Academy of sciences.

== Biography ==
He has directed CRISMAT, a joint laboratory of the National Engineering School of Caen (ENSICAEN) of the University of Caen and the CNRS.

He worked on cuprates, with the aim of making them electrodes of capacitors resistant to oxidation due to sintering, without noble metals. Karl Alexander Müller and Johannes Georg Bednorz have shown that some of these compounds are superconductors, beginning the aerea of high temperature superconductors. They were awarded the Nobel Prize in Physics in 1987, after having reused a "sandwich" of copper oxide sheets designed by Bernard Raveau and his laboratory in Caen.

== Scientific work ==
Bernard Raveau is a specialist in the crystallochemistry of transition metal oxides. He has devoted a large part of his research to solid-state chemistry and materials science.

Bernard Raveau discovered new tunnel structures and explained non-stop stoichiometry phenomena.

He then focused on the discovery of original structures with new physical or chemical properties, Bernard Raveau discovered new series of cuprates with a layered structure based on bismuth or thallium, or mercury associated with an alkaline earth cation, which are new superconducting materials at high critical temperature.

Bernard Raveau showed the colossal magnetoresistance (CMR) effect in insulating manganites, in small-sized A cation manganites doped with n, and discovered the CMR effect induced by doping manganese sites with different cations such as cobalt, nickel, chromium, strontium, ruthenium. This work could have developments in information storage processes. Finally, Bernard Raveau has identified cobaltites with a disjointed structure (misfits) whose remarkable thermoelectric properties are well studied for energy conversion at high temperatures.

== Distinctions ==
He was awarded Chevalier de la Légion d'honneur in 2001.

He was awarded the title of Fellow of the Royal Society of Chemistry on 25 March 2009 for his work in materials science.

== Books ==
- (in English) Bernard Raveau, Claude Michel, Maryvonne Hervieu and Daniel Groult, Crystal Chemistry of High-Tc Superconducting Copper Oxides, Springer Verlag, 1991, 331 p. (ISBN 978-3540515456)
- (in English) Chintamani N.R. Rao and Bernard Raveau, Transition Metal Oxides: Structure, Properties, and Synthesis of Ceramic Oxides, John Wiley & Sons, 1995, 392 p. (ISBN 978-0471189718)
