= Paul K. Chu =

Materials scientist and Hong Kong professor

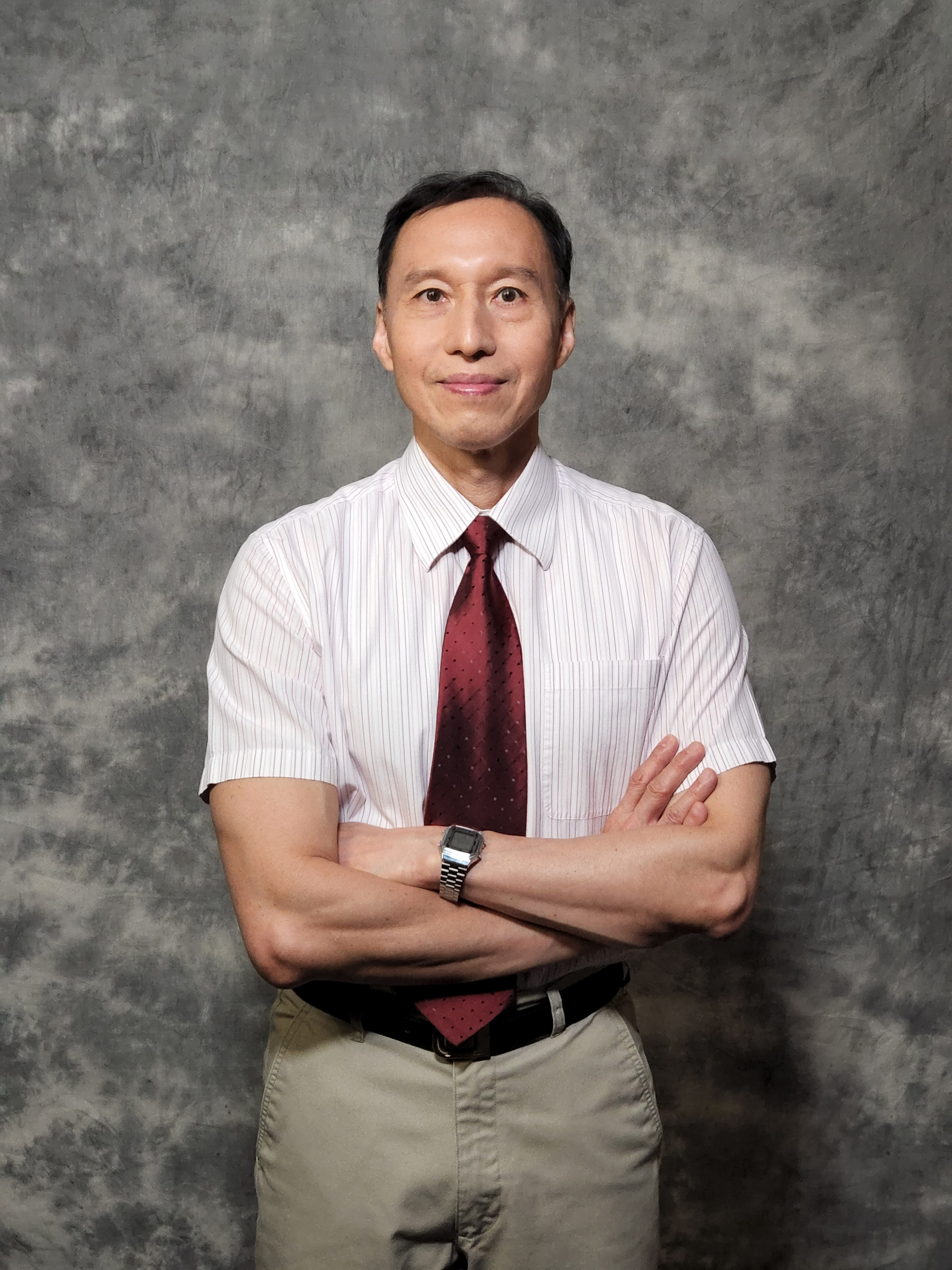
- Occupation: Professor of Materials Engineering
- Website: scholars.cityu.edu.hk/en/persons/paul-kim-ho-chu(cb40bd34-a067-44b4-b632-ca25f922f5af).html

Paul K. Chu (朱劍豪) is a materials scientist specializing in plasma surface modification and materials science. He is a Chair Professor of Materials Engineering at City University of Hong Kong, with appointments in the Department of Physics, Department of Materials Science and Engineering, and Department of Biomedical Engineering.

== Education ==
Chu received a Bachelor of Science degree in mathematics (cum laude) from The Ohio State University in 1977. He obtained his Master of Science and Doctor of Philosophy degrees in chemistry from Cornell University in 1979 and 1982, respectively.

Chu worked as a teaching assistant and research assistant from 1977 to 1982 and received the DuPont Teaching Award in 1978 for his teaching contributions. Prior to beginning his doctoral studies, he also worked as a research chemist at the New England Aquarium in Boston and as a research assistant at Ohio State University.

=== Career and research ===
Chu's research focuses on plasma surface engineering, biomaterials, and nanotechnology. He has held academic positions at City University of Hong Kong and has been involved in international collaborations in materials science.

From 1982 to 1990, he held several positions at Charles Evans & Associates in California. His work during this period involved surface analysis and characterization techniques, in semiconductor materials and research.

He serves as chairman of the International Plasma-Based Ion Implantation Executive Committee.

=== Honors and awards ===
Chu is a Fellow of several professional organizations, including the American Physical Society, American Vacuum Society, Institute of Electrical and Electronics Engineers, Materials Research Society, Hong Kong Academy of Engineering, and Hong Kong Institution of Engineers.

== Publications ==
Chu has authored or co-authored more than 2,500 scientific papers and has contributed to books and book chapters in plasma science, materials engineering, and nanotechnology. His research publications have appeared in journals such as reflecting work on nanostructured materials, plasma surface modification, and biomedical materials.

== Patents ==
Chu holds patents related to materials science and surface engineering.
