= Alex Ignatiev =

American physicist (born 1945)

Alex Ignatiev (born 1945) is an American physicist, currently distinguished professor at University of Houston.
