= William Gardner Pfann =

American semiconductor scientist (1917 to 1982)

William Gardner Pfann (October 27, 1917 – October 22, 1982) was an inventor and materials scientist with Bell Labs. Pfann is known for his development of zone melting which is essential to the semiconductor industry. As stated in an official history of Bell Labs, "Timely invention of zone refining by W.G.Pfann ... was a major contribution that helped bring the impurities in germanium and silicon under control."

== Early life ==
Pfann was born in Brooklyn, New York City. Showing unusual facility with materials, in 1935, when he was only eighteen years of age, he started with the Chemical Research Department of Bell Labs. He had no college degree at that time, but attending night school at Cooper Union led to a bachelor's degree in chemical engineering in 1940.

Pfann was involved in William Shockley's efforts with Bell Labs to use semiconductors to make devices to replace vacuum tubes. The early efforts used germanium. They made high back-voltage germanium rectifiers in 1945. Pfann devised one of the first point-contact transistors: "Specifically, W.G. Pfann had modified the Western Electric 1N26 shielded point-contact (silicon) diode to include two spring-loaded cat whisker point contacts, making a three-electrode configuration with good electrical amplifying properties. This configuration became known at the Type A transistor." He and Walter Brattain developed the process of "forming" these transistors to make them more uniform. Pfann also invented a method of bonding fine gold wires to germanium that made the device functional. "The quiet, unassuming man grew steadily in everyone's esteem as he made one valuable contribution after another to the semiconductor research effort."

== Breakthrough ==
The zone melting process that Pfann is known for revolutionized engineering possibilities: "The purity that can be attained by zone refining was absolutely unprecedented in the history of materials processing. Impurity levels of a few parts per million had previously been considered excellent; Pfann's technique improved on this by factors of over 1,000.".

In 1952, Pfann published the revelatory article "Principles of Zone-Melting" in the Transactions of the American Institute of Mining, Metallurgical, and Petroleum Engineers. This article applied zone melting in two industrial processes: purification of a solvent material (called zone refining), and production of a uniform distribution of a solute in an ingot (called zone leveling). Three appendices described mathematical models of the processes in zone melting.

In 1958, Pfann published the first edition of his text Zone Melting with John Wiley. A second edition appeared in 1966, and in 1978 publisher Robert E. Krieger of Huntington, New York issued the third edition.

In 1962, the journal Science published a short digest of the zone melting method by Pfann. This article concludes by treating the slightly larger topic of temperature gradient zone melting. Pfann describes how and why a drop of gold on a germanium slab moves toward the hottest spot. He says this method was used to "make complex p-n junction shapes for special transistors". He observes the motion of brine on sea ice and proposes the purification of sea water. Further he notes the relation to the physics of geological formations.

== Appreciation ==
In 1973 Pfann was the first to receive the Gordon E. Moore Medal for Outstanding Achievement in Solid State Science and Technology. Pfann was elected to the National Academy of Sciences (U.S.) in 1975. In 1976 the American Institute of Physics awarded him the James C. McGroddy Prize for New Materials.

On his passing some coworkers wrote:

His energy, his high standards of honesty in experimentation and his unprejudiced approach to the new, the untried, and even the heretical, helped define the word scientist for a large number of his acquaintances.

Richard Hamming used Pfann to illustrate professional development. At first he noted Pfann "didn't know much mathematics and wasn't really articulate." Then Hamming showed him how to use computers and "his shyness, his awkwardness and his inarticulateness fell away and he became much more productive in many other ways."
