= Zhao Zhongxian =

Chinese physicist (born 1941)

- 赵忠贤
- Born: January 30, 1941 (age 85); Xinmin, Liaoning, Manchukuo
- Education: University of Science and Technology of China; University of Cambridge
- Awards: Bernd T. Matthias Prize (2015); Highest Science and Technology Award (2016); Asian Scientist 100 (2016 and 2019); Future Science Prize (2023)
- Scientific career
- Fields: High-temperature superconductivity
- Workplaces: Chinese Academy of Sciences

Zhao Zhongxian (simplified Chinese: 赵忠贤; traditional Chinese: 趙忠賢; pinyin: Zhào Zhōngxián; born 30 January 1941) is a Chinese physicist. He is internationally known for his studies on High-temperature superconductivity (HTS).

He was a member of the 8th, 10th, 11th National Committee of the Chinese People's Political Consultative Conference. He was also an alternate member of the 15th Central Committee of the Chinese Communist Party.

== Biography ==
Zhao was born in Xinmin, Liaoning, Manchukuo, on January 30, 1941.

In 1959, he was accepted to the University of Science and Technology of China and graduated in 1964. After university, he was assigned to the Institute of Physics, Chinese Academy of Sciences as a researcher.

In December 1973, he joined the Chinese Communist Party. That same year, he was sent abroad to study at the expense of the government. He was educated in the University of Cambridge from February 1974 to September 1975. In 1979, he became deputy director of Superconductor Classification Laboratory at the Institute of Physics, Chinese Academy of Sciences.

In 1987 he was elected a fellow of the World Academy of Sciences (TWAS), and two years later he was elected a fellow of the World Ceramic Academy. In 1988, Chinese University of Hong Kong conferred on him an Honorary Doctor of Science. In 1991 he became a member of the Chinese Academy of Sciences. He was director of Division of Mathematics and Physics, Chinese Academy of Sciences from 1994 to 2000.

== Papers ==
- Lumley, J.M.; Evetts, J.E.; Chao, C.H. (1978). "Flux flow measurements in irreversible type II superconductors" (PDF). Journal de Physique Lettres. 39 (21). EDP Sciences: 393–395. doi:10.1051/jphyslet:019780039021039300. ISSN 0302-072X. S2CID 42196205.
- Zhao, Zhong-xian; Zhang, Dian-lin; Lin, Shu-yuan; Shen, Zhi-gong (1981). "The resistivity anomaly at the onset temperature of the spin-glass-like state in (Pd_{.9965}Fe_{.0035})_{.95}Mn_{.05}". Physica B+C. 107 (1–3). Elsevier BV: 625–626. Bibcode:1981PhyBC.107..625Z. doi:10.1016/0378-4363(81)90615-x. ISSN 0378-4363.
- Anisotropic Superconducting Critical Currents for in Situ Comosites Cu-Nb; Z. X. Zhao, C. G. Cui, S. Q. Gou, D. K. Finnemore and J. D. Verhoeven; Chinese Physics 5 (1985); 776.
- Zhao, Z.X.; Chen, L.Q.; Huang, Y.Z.; Mai, Z.H.; Wang, J.H.; et al. (1988). "Superconducting phases in Bi-Sr-Ca-Cu-O system". Annales de Physique. 13 (5). EDP Sciences: 339–348. Bibcode:1988AnPh...13..339Z. doi:10.1051/anphys:01988001305033900. ISSN 0003-4169.
- Zhao, Z.X.; Chen, L.Q.; Mai, Z.H.; Huang, Y.Z.; Xiao, Z.L.; Chu, X.; Zheng, D.N.; Jia, S.L.; Wang, J.H.; Chen, G.H.; NI, Y.M.; BI, J.Q.; Yang, Q.S.; Shen, D.H.; WANG, L.Z. (1988). "120 K Superconductor TlBaCaCu_{2}O_{y}". Modern Physics Letters B. 02 (1). World Scientific Pub Co Pte Lt: 479–481. Bibcode:1988MPLB....2..479Z. doi:10.1142/s0217984988000047. ISSN 0217-9849.
- Cao, Z.S.; Zhang, Y.; Zhao, Z.X. (1990-10-20). "Intrinsic Flux Pinning Force in High T_{c} Oxide Superconductors". Modern Physics Letters B. 04 (19). World Scientific Pub Co Pte Lt: 1227–1236. Bibcode:1990MPLB....4.1227C. doi:10.1142/s0217984990001549. ISSN 0217-9849.

== Awards ==
- 1997 and 2014 Science and Technology Award of the Ho Leung Ho Lee Foundation
- 2015 Bernd T. Matthias Prize
- 2016 Highest Science and Technology Award
