= Alister McLellan =

New Zealand mathematician and academic physicist (1919–2012)

- Born: Alister George McLellan; 4 June 1919; Christchurch, New Zealand
- Died: 1 July 2012 (aged 93)
- Education: University of Edinburgh
- Scientific career
- Thesis: The radial distribution function and its application to the properties of fluids (1948)
- Doctoral advisor: Max Born
- Doctoral students: David J. Lockwood

Alister George McLellan (4 June 1919 – 1 July 2012) was a New Zealand mathematician and physicist.

== Academic career ==
Born in Christchurch and brought up in Westport, McLellan attended Nelson College and then the University of Otago, from where he graduated with a BSc and an MSc in mathematics and science. He joined the Department of Scientific and Industrial Research doing war work and after the war went to Edinburgh to do a PhD under Max Born. His thesis was entitled The radial distribution function and its application to the properties of fluids.

McLellan returned to the University of Otago and the University of Canterbury where he rose in the ranks of university administration in parallel with his research, becoming head of department in 1955, foundation chair of the new University Grants Committee. He was made a Fellow of the Royal Society of New Zealand in 1961 and Nuffield Foundation Commonwealth Bursary. He served as president of the Canterbury Branch of the Royal Society of New Zealand. He retired in 1985.

== Selected works ==
- The Classical Thermodynamics of Deformable Materials Cambridge University Press 1980, reissued 2011. ISBN 0521180120
