= Texas Center for Superconductivity =

Coordinates: 29.72455°N 95.3453°W

Texas Center for Superconductivity (TcSUH)
- Motto: Discover new high temperature superconducting–, energy– and nano– materials, advance their applications in partnerships with industry, and disseminate knowledge through education, outreach, and technology for the benefit of the public and the environment.
- Director: Zhifeng Ren
- Academic staff: 19 project leaders
- Administrative staff: 13
- Undergraduates: 7
- Doctoral students: 88
- Location: Houston, Texas, United States
- Website: tcsuh.com

The Texas Center for Superconductivity (TcSUH) is a research center based at the University of Houston with main focus on superconductivity and materials research, aiming to develop high temperature superconducting materials (HTS). Scientists and engineers from the chemistry and physics department as well as from chemical, electrical, computer, and mechanical engineering work together closely to gain fundamental understanding of HTS. The TcSUH-facilities comprises more than the area of a football field, distributed over 3 buildings and containing equipment to fabricate and analyse superconductor materials and compound semiconductors, etc.

== Research ==
The TcSUH consists of three research divisions:

- The division Superconductivity and Related Materials focuses on fundamental properties of High-temperature superconductivity which includes biomedical and other applications.
- The division Energy Materials and Applications deals with aspects of energy transmission and storage which includes research on nano materials.
- The recently established Applied Research Hub provides infrastructure and collaborations with industry.
