= Emanuel Tutuc =

American physicist

- Education: Princeton University
- Scientific career
- Fields: Physics
- Workplaces: University of Texas at Austin

Emanuel Tutuc is an American physicist and professor at University of Texas at Austin and an Elected Fellow of the American Physical Society.
