= M. Brian Maple =

American physicist (born 1939)

- Born: November 20, 1939 (age 86); Chula Vista, California, U.S.
- Education: UC San Diego; San Diego State University
- Known for: Work in superconductivity and magnetism
- Scientific career
- Fields: Nanophysics; Superconductivity
- Workplaces: UC San Diego
- Thesis: Superconductivity and magnetism of lanthanum-rare earth dialuminides (1969)
- Doctoral advisor: Bernd T. Matthias
- Website: UCSD Homepage

Merrill Brian Maple (born November 20, 1939) is an American physicist. He is a distinguished professor of physics and holds the Bernd T. Matthias Chair in the physics department at the University of California, San Diego, and conducts research at the university's Center for Advanced Nanoscience. He has also served as the director of UCSD's Institute for Pure and Applied Physical Sciences (1995-2009) and its Center for Interface and Materials Science (1990-2010). His primary research interest is condensed matter physics, involving phenomena like magnetism and superconductivity. He has authored or co-authored more than 900 scientific publications and five patents in correlated electron physics, high pressure physics, nano physics, and surface science.

== Education and career ==
Maple was born November 20, 1939, in Chula Vista, California. He received BA and BS degrees in 1963 from San Diego State College (now San Diego State University). He received an MS in 1965 and a PhD in physics from UCSD in 1969, working under Bernd T. Matthias and has been on the UCSD faculty since 1973. He became an associate professor in 1977, was named a full professor in 1981 and a distinguished professor in 2005. He has held the Bernd T. Matthias endowed chair since 1990. From 2004 through 2010 he also served as chair of the physics department.

He has been granted a Guggenheim Fellowship (1984) and a Humboldt Research Award (1998). In addition to his work at UCSD he was a Bernd T. Matthias Scholar in the Center for Materials Science at Los Alamos National Laboratory (1993). He was granted an honorary professorship at the Trzebiatowski Institute for Low Temperature and Structure Research of the Polish Academy of Sciences (2006) and a Science Lectureship Award at Chiba University in Tokyo (2010).

He organized and presided over a famous "Special Session on Recent Developments in High T_{c} Superconductivity", nicknamed "the Woodstock of physics", during the March 1987 meeting of the American Physical Society. The session, which was added to the agenda at the last minute, dealt with newly discovered high temperature superconductors. It featured 51 speakers, limited to 5–10 minutes per speaker, and lasted until 3:15 am. More than 1,800 scientists crammed into the lecture room and another 2,000 watched on television. Maple also presided over a 20th-anniversary recognition and review of the famous session, held at the American Physical Society's 2007 meeting in Denver.

== Recognition ==
- In 1987 he was named Distinguished Alumnus of the Year by UCSD.
- In 1988 he was named Distinguished Alumnus of the Year by SDSU College of Sciences.
- In 1996 he received the David Adler Lectureship Award in the Field of Materials Physics from the American Physical Society.
- In 2000 he received the James C. McGroddy Prize for New Materials from the American Physical Society for "the synthesis of novel d and f electron materials and for the study of their physics."
- In 2004 he was elected to the National Academy of Sciences.
- Other awards include the Bernd T. Matthias Prize for Superconducting Materials, the Frank H. Spedding Award for Research on Rare Earths, and the David Adler Lectureship Award (1996).
- He is a Fellow of the American Physical Society and the American Association for the Advancement of Science.
