= Bernd T. Matthias =

American condensed matter physicist (1918–1980)

Bernard Theodor Matthias
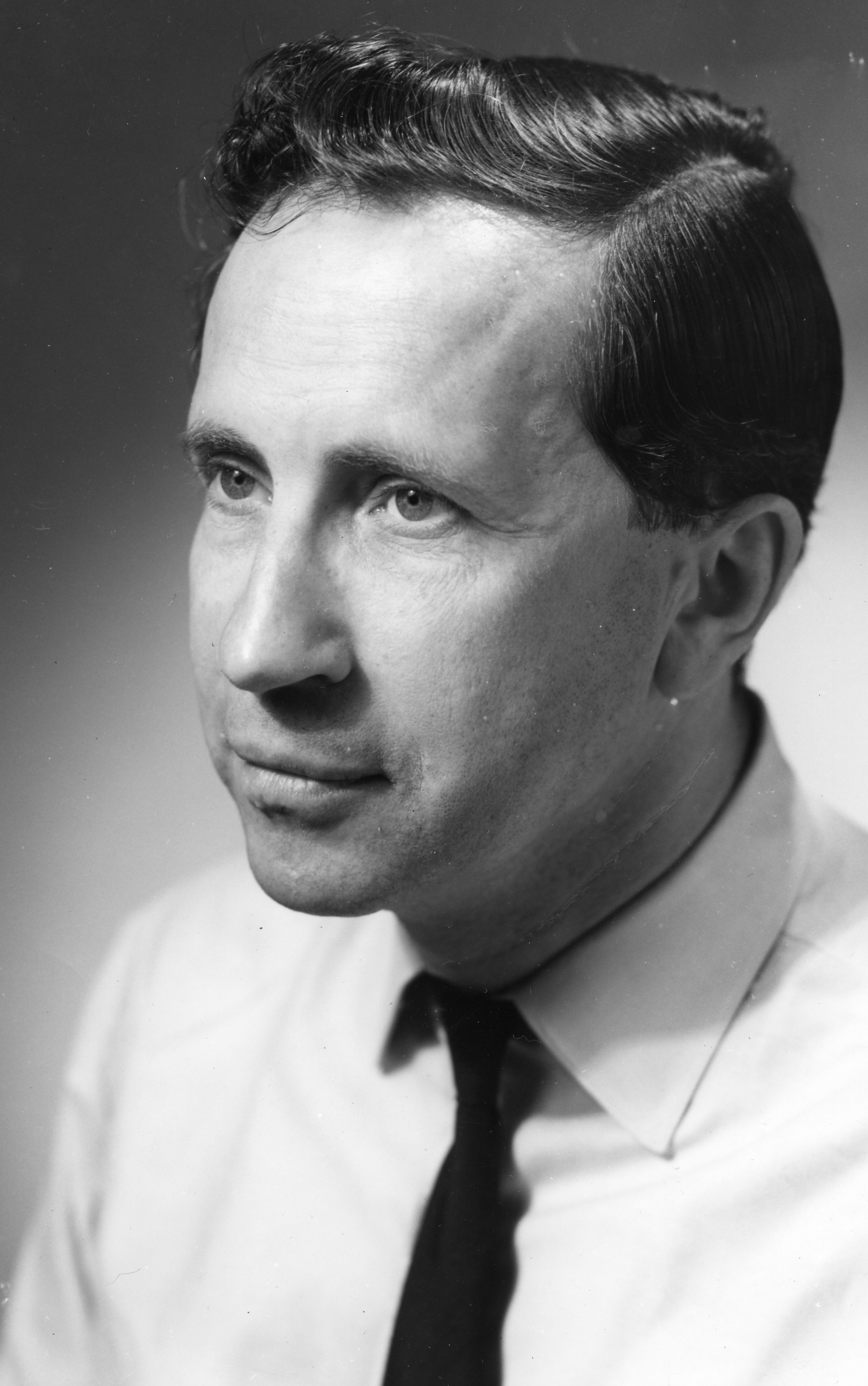
- Born: June 8, 1918; Frankfurt am Main, German Empire
- Died: October 27, 1980 (aged 62); La Jolla, California, US
- Education: ETH Zurich
- Known for: Matthias rules
- Spouse: Joan Trapp Matthias
- Awards: Oliver E. Buckley Condensed Matter Prize elected member of NAS elected fellow of AAAS; APS Prize for New Materials
- Scientific career
- Fields: Solid state physics
- Workplaces: UC San Diego; Los Alamos National Laboratory; University of Chicago; MIT; Bell Labs
- Thesis: Ueber den piezoelektrisch bedingten ΔE-Effekt der Seignetteelektrika (1943)
- Doctoral advisor: Paul Scherrer
- Other academic advisors: Arthur R. von Hippel
- Doctoral students: Paul Ching Wu Chu; M. Brian Maple

Bernd T. Matthias (June 8, 1918 – October 27, 1980) was a German-born American physicist credited with discoveries of hundreds of elements and alloys with superconducting properties. He was said to have discovered more elements and compounds with superconducting properties than any other scientist.

== Education and career ==
Bernd Theodor Matthias was born in Frankfurt, Germany on June 8, 1918. He received his PhD in physics from the Federal Institute of Technology in Zurich in 1943. He also earned a D.Sc. from the University of Lausanne in 1947. He immigrated to the United States in 1947.

He taught at the Massachusetts Institute of Technology (1947–1948), then went to work for Bell Laboratories in 1948, and worked at the University of Chicago (1949–1951), before joining the physics faculty of University of California, San Diego in 1961. He remained at UCSD for the rest of his career, conducting research and mentoring students who became distinguished physicists in their turn. He is best known for his work on solid state physics and the behavior of matter at extremely low temperatures; he also did important work on ferroelectricity. Matthias was also a member of the JASON defense advisory group.

In 1954, he came up with his famous Matthias' rules, a series of empirical guidelines on how to find superconductors.

== Honors and awards ==
In 1965 he was elected to both the National Academy of Sciences, and the American Academy of Arts and Sciences.

He received the Research Corporation Award (1962), John Price Wetherill Medal of the Franklin Institute (1964), the Oliver E. Buckley Condensed Matter Prize (1970) and James C. McGroddy Prize for New Materials (1979).

The University of California, San Diego has an endowed chair in physics named for him; the Bernd T. Matthias Chair in Physics is currently held by M. Brian Maple, who received his PhD under Mathias.

The Bernd T. Matthias Prize for Superconducting Materials was created in 1989 and is awarded annually at the M2S (Materials and Mechanisms of Superconductivity) Conference to recognize innovative contributions to the material aspects of superconductivity. The award was originally sponsored by Bell Labs; since 2000 it has been sponsored by the Texas Center for Superconductivity at the University of Houston, whose founding director, Paul C. W. Chu, was Matthias' former student.

== See also ==
- Bernd T. Matthias Prize
