= Frank Verstraete =

Belgian quantum physicist (born 1972)

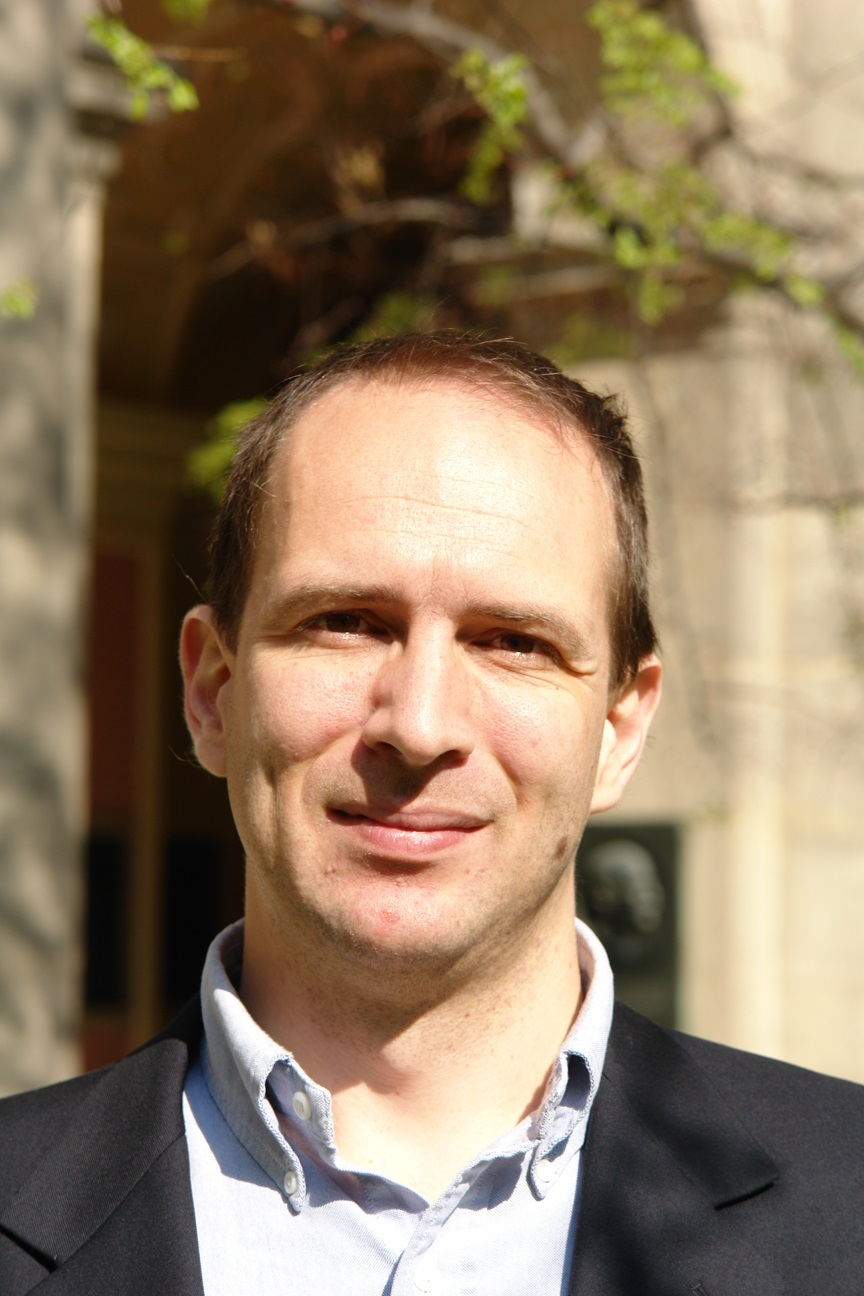
- Born: November 1972 (age 53–54); Belgium
- Education: Ghent University, KU Leuven
- Known for: Quantum entanglement, Tensor network, Quantum Computing
- Awards: Lieben Prize (2009), ERC grants (2009, 2015, 2023), Francqui Prize (2018)
- Scientific career
- Fields: Physicist
- Workplaces: Max Planck Institute of Quantum Optics, Caltech, University of Vienna, Ghent University, University of Cambridge
- Doctoral advisor: Bart De Moor, Henri Verschelde
- Other academic advisors: Ignacio Cirac, John Preskill

Frank Verstraete (born November 1972) is a Belgian quantum physicist who is the Leigh Trapnell Professor of Quantum Physics at the Faculty of Mathematics, University of Cambridge and professor at the Faculty of Physics of Ghent University. He has worked on the interface between quantum information theory and quantum many-body physics and was an early proponent of the use of tensor networks and entanglement theory in quantum many body systems. A recurring theme of Verstraete's work is the reformulation of seemingly intractable problems in quantum physics as problems in linear algebra.

== Education and career ==
Verstraete was born in 1972, the son of Belgian doctors, and attended the Abdijschool van Zevenkerken. He obtained a degree of electrical engineering in Louvain and of Master in Physics from Ghent University, and obtained his PhD on the topic of quantum entanglement in 2002 under supervision of Bart De Moor and Henri Verschelde at the KU Leuven. He pioneered the use of quantum entanglement as a unifying theme for describing strongly interacting quantum many-body systems, which are among the most challenging systems to analyze theoretically or numerically, but also very promising for future quantum technologies such as quantum computers.

From 2002 to 2004 he was a postdoctoral researcher at the Max Planck Institute for Quantum Optics in the group of Ignacio Cirac and from 2004 to 2006 he was a postdoctoral researcher at the California Institute of Technology. In 2006, he became full professor and the chair of theoretical quantum nanophysics at the University of Vienna. He moved back to Ghent University with an Odysseus grant from the FWO in 2012, where he has since built a research group on applications of entanglement to quantum many-body systems. Since the fall of 2022, he holds the chair of Quantum Physics at the Department of Applied Mathematics and Theoretical Physics of the University of Cambridge.

== Scientific work ==
Among his contributions to quantum information theory is the classification of the nine equivalence classes under stochastic local operations and classical communication (SLOCC) in which four qubits can be entangled. The underlying mathematical question, the classification of 2×2×2×2 tensors, is a classic problem in algebraic geometry: posed by Constantin Le Paige in 1881 and advanced by Corrado Segre in 1922 using geometric methods, it had resisted a solution by the advanced machinery of invariant theory. Verstraete solved it by recasting it as a simple problem in linear algebra, an approach that would set the tone for much of his later work. In a companion paper, he constructed normal forms for arbitrary multipartite quantum states, together with a constructive algorithm for bringing any tensor into its normal form; this algorithm was later used as a central primitive in the theory of tensor scaling, the multilinear generalisation of Sinkhorn's matrix scaling, with applications ranging from invariant theory to computational complexity.

Verstraete, together with Audenaert, also solved the long-standing open problem of symmetric and asymmetric quantum hypothesis testing by proving the quantum generalisations of the classical Chernoff and Hoeffding bounds, which characterise the optimal error exponents for discriminating quantum states. Together with Bravyi and Hastings, he introduced Lieb–Robinson bounds in the field of quantum information, proving that correlations and topological quantum order cannot be created by local Hamiltonian evolution in a time shorter than one proportional to the system size, establishing rigorous lower bounds on the time needed to prepare topologically ordered states. He also laid the groundwork for the simulation of fermionic matter on a quantum computer: together with Cirac, he introduced a local transformation mapping fermions to qubits, known as the Verstraete–Cirac transformation, and he constructed the fermionic fast Fourier transform and related quantum circuits that form the basis for the quantum simulation of realistic materials. In three papers between 2009 and 2011, Verstraete established quantum Markov processes as a paradigm for quantum computation and many-body state preparation: together with Wolf and Cirac, he demonstrated that universal quantum computation can be realised entirely through dissipation, with Temme, he developed the χ²-divergence framework for bounding the mixing times of quantum Markov processes, and developed a quantum generalisation of the classical Metropolis algorithm for preparing thermal states and finding ground states of many-body Hamiltonians.

Verstraete has been centrally involved in the development of tensor networks since their inception, and the resulting variational methods define the state of the art for simulating strongly interacting quantum many-body systems. With Ignacio Cirac he introduced projected entangled pair states (PEPS), the generalisation of matrix product states (MPS) to two and higher dimensions, in a 2004 preprint that was never formally published yet became one of the founding documents of the field. These methods rest on the insight that ground states of local Hamiltonians obey an entanglement area law, and therefore occupy an exponentially small corner of Hilbert space which tensor networks parameterise efficiently; Verstraete and Cirac made this precise by proving that ground states of gapped local Hamiltonians are faithfully represented by MPS with a bond dimension that does not grow with system size, providing the rigorous justification for the density matrix renormalization group. They extended the framework to finite temperature and dissipation through matrix product density operators, and to the continuum through continuous MPS for quantum fields. Because tensor network states form a smooth manifold rather than a linear space, the natural language for dynamics on them is that of tangent spaces: with Haegeman he exploited this geometric structure to construct a variational ansatz for elementary excitations on top of an MPS and a time-dependent variational principle that unifies real-time evolution and ground-state optimisation on the same manifold.

A second strand of his work on tensor networks treats the local tensor not as a numerical approximation but as an object of study in its own right: whether the particles of a phase are fermions, whether it is topologically ordered and which symmetries it supports are all fixed by the symmetry algebra of a small array of numbers repeated across the lattice. That this is even well defined rests on what Verstraete coined the "fundamental theorem of MPS" — the statement that any two local tensors generating the same state are related by a gauge transformation — which underpins most structural results on matrix product states, including the classification of symmetry-protected topological phases in one dimension. Fermionic statistics, for instance, can be built directly into the network, either through fermionic PEPS, developed with Kraus, Schuch and Cirac, or through tensor networks over graded vector spaces, in which the fermionic sign structure is carried by the grading itself. Starting in 2014, Verstraete and his collaborators showed that topological order in tensor networks is characterised by algebras of matrix product operators (MPOs) acting on the virtual degrees of freedom, from which the anyonic excitations of the phase can be constructed explicitly. This revealed that topological order — introduced by Xiao-Gang Wen as physics beyond the Landau paradigm of symmetry breaking, and epitomised by the exactly solvable models of Alexei Kitaev — is, after all, still a story of symmetries and their breaking, albeit generalised symmetries that are only visible through the entanglement degrees of freedom which form the central object of tensor network theory. With Lootens and Delcamp, these MPO algebras were subsequently promoted to a systematic theory of generalised symmetries and dualities of quantum lattice models, in which the duality transformations themselves are realised as explicit MPO intertwiners. This body of work provided an early lattice realisation of the categorical structures — fusion categories, module categories and their associators — that underlie the present-day symmetry topological field theory (SymTFT) description of generalised symmetries.

== Awards ==
Verstraete has received numerous awards, among them the Hermann Kümmel early achievement award in many-body physics, the Lieben Prize in 2009 and the Francqui Prize in 2018 and is also distinguished visiting research chair at the Perimeter Institute for Theoretical Physics in Waterloo, Ontario.

== Books ==
Together with Céline Broeckaert, he wrote the popular science book Why Nobody Understands Quantum Physics (Pan Books). Waterstones included Why Nobody Understands Quantum Physics in its selection of the 2025 best popular-science books. The book has been published in eight languages.

== Personal life ==
Verstraete is married to Céline Broeckaert.

== Selected publications ==
- A study of entanglement in quantum information theory, Ph.D. Thesis, Katholieke Universiteit Leuven, 2002.
- Verstraete, Frank; Dehaene, J.; de Moor, B.; Verschelde, H. (2002). "Four qubits can be entangled in nine different ways". Phys. Rev. A. 65 (5) 052112. arXiv:quant-ph/0109033. Bibcode:2002PhRvA..65e2112V. doi:10.1103/PhysRevA.65.052112. S2CID 38168590.
- Verstraete, F.; Garcia-Ripoll, J. J.; Cirac, J. I. (2004). "Matrix Product Density Operators: Simulation of Finite-Temperature and Dissipative Systems". Phys. Rev. Lett. 93 (20) 207204. arXiv:cond-mat/0406426. Bibcode:2004PhRvL..93t7204V. doi:10.1103/PhysRevLett.93.207204. PMID 15600964. S2CID 36218923.
- Verstraete, F.; Wolf &, M. M.; Cirac, J. Ignacio (2009). "Quantum computation and quantum-state engineering driven by dissipation". Nature Physics. 5 (9): 633–636. arXiv:0803.1447. Bibcode:2009NatPh...5..633V. doi:10.1038/nphys1342.
- Kraus, C. V.; Schuch, N.; Verstraete, F.; Cirac, J. I. (2010). "Fermionic projected entangled pair states". Phys. Rev. A. 81 (5) 052338. arXiv:0904.4667. Bibcode:2010PhRvA..81e2338K. doi:10.1103/PhysRevA.81.052338. S2CID 56378408.
- Verstraete, F.; Cirac, J. I.; Murg, V. (2008). "Matrix Product States, Projected Entangled Pair States, and variational renormalization group methods for quantum spin systems". Adv. Phys. 57 (2): 143–224. arXiv:0907.2796. Bibcode:2008AdPhy..57..143V. doi:10.1080/14789940801912366. S2CID 17208624.
- Verstraete, F.; Cirac, J. I. (2010). "Continuous Matrix Product States for Quantum Fields" (PDF). Phys. Rev. Lett. 104 (19) 190405. arXiv:1002.1824. Bibcode:2010PhRvL.104s0405V. doi:10.1103/PhysRevLett.104.190405. PMID 20866951. S2CID 26530437.
- Haegeman, J; Lubich, C; Oseledets, I; Vandereycken, B; Verstraete, F (2016). "Unifying time evolution and optimization with matrix product states" (PDF). Phys. Rev. B. 94 (16) 165116. Bibcode:2016PhRvB..94p5116H. doi:10.1103/PhysRevB.94.165116. hdl:1854/LU-8152454. S2CID 53321291.
- Zauner-Stauber, V; Vanderstraeten, L; Fishman, M T; Verstraete, F; Haegeman, J (2018). "Variational optimization algorithms for uniform matrix product states". Phys. Rev. B. 97 (4) 045145. arXiv:1701.07035. Bibcode:2018PhRvB..97d5145Z. doi:10.1103/PhysRevB.97.045145. S2CID 39603878.
- Şahinoğlu, M B; Williamson, D; Bultinck, N; Mariën, M; Haegeman, J; Schuch, N; Verstraete, F (2021). "Characterizing topological order with matrix product operators". Annales Henri Poincaré. 22 (2): 563–592. arXiv:1409.2150. Bibcode:2021AnHP...22..563S. doi:10.1007/s00023-020-00992-4. hdl:1854/LU-8707312. S2CID 117976990.
