= Garnet K.-L. Chan =

Theoretical chemist

Garnet Kin-Lic Chan
- Education: University of Cambridge
- Awards: National Academy of Sciences (2025); ACS Award in Pure Chemistry (2009); William O. Baker Award for Initiatives in Research (2014)
- Scientific career
- Fields: Theoretical chemistry Quantum chemistry
- Workplaces: California Institute of Technology; Princeton University; Cornell University
- Website: www.chan-lab.caltech.edu

Garnet Kin-Lic Chan is a theoretical chemist and the Bren Professor of Chemistry at the California Institute of Technology (Caltech). His research focuses on quantum mechanics, specifically the development of numerical methods to simulate quantum many-body systems in chemistry and physics, including density matrix renormalization group (DMRG) theory and tensor network algorithms.

== Education and career ==
Chan attended the University of Cambridge, where he was a member of Christ's College. He received his Bachelor of Arts in 1996 and completed his Ph.D. in 2000 with Prof. Nicholas Handy as his doctoral advisor. Following his graduate studies, he moved to the United States as a Miller Research Fellow at the University of California, Berkeley, a position he held from 2000 to 2002. He subsequently completed postdoctoral work at Cambridge as a Todd-Croucher Junior Research Fellow.

In 2004, Chan joined the faculty of Cornell University as an Assistant Professor of Chemistry and Chemical Biology, eventually serving as an Associate Professor until 2012. He was recruited to Princeton University in 2012, where he served as the A. Barton Hepburn Professor of Chemistry from 2012 to 2016. Chan moved to the California Institute of Technology in 2016 to assume his current role as the Bren Professor of Chemistry.

== Research and recognition ==
Chan's scientific work centers on understanding the electronic structure of complex materials and molecules. He and his research group have advanced quantum simulations in areas such as strong electron correlation, many-particle problems in the condensed phase, dynamical simulations of spectra, and coupling between electron and nuclear degrees of freedom. Advances in numerical techniques include density matrix renormalization, canonical transformation-based down-foldings, tensor network algorithms, local quantum chemistry methods, quantum embeddings, and new quantum Monte Carlo algorithms.

The scientific community has recognized his contributions with several awards. He is a member of the International Academy of Quantum Molecular Science (IAQMS). In 2013, the National Academy of Sciences awarded him the William O. Baker Award for Initiatives in Research for his innovations in algorithms such as density matrix renormalization group (DMRG) and quantum embedding to describe the quantum mechanics of strongly correlated systems. He received the Medal of the International Academy of Quantum Molecular Science in 2014 and the ACS Award in Pure Chemistry from the American Chemical Society in 2009.

He was elected as a member of the National Academy of Sciences in 2024. Additional honors include the Camille Dreyfus Teacher-Scholar Award, the Sloan Research Fellowship, and the National Science Foundation CAREER Award. He was elected a Fellow of the Royal Society in 2026.
