= Román Orús =

Theoretical Physicist

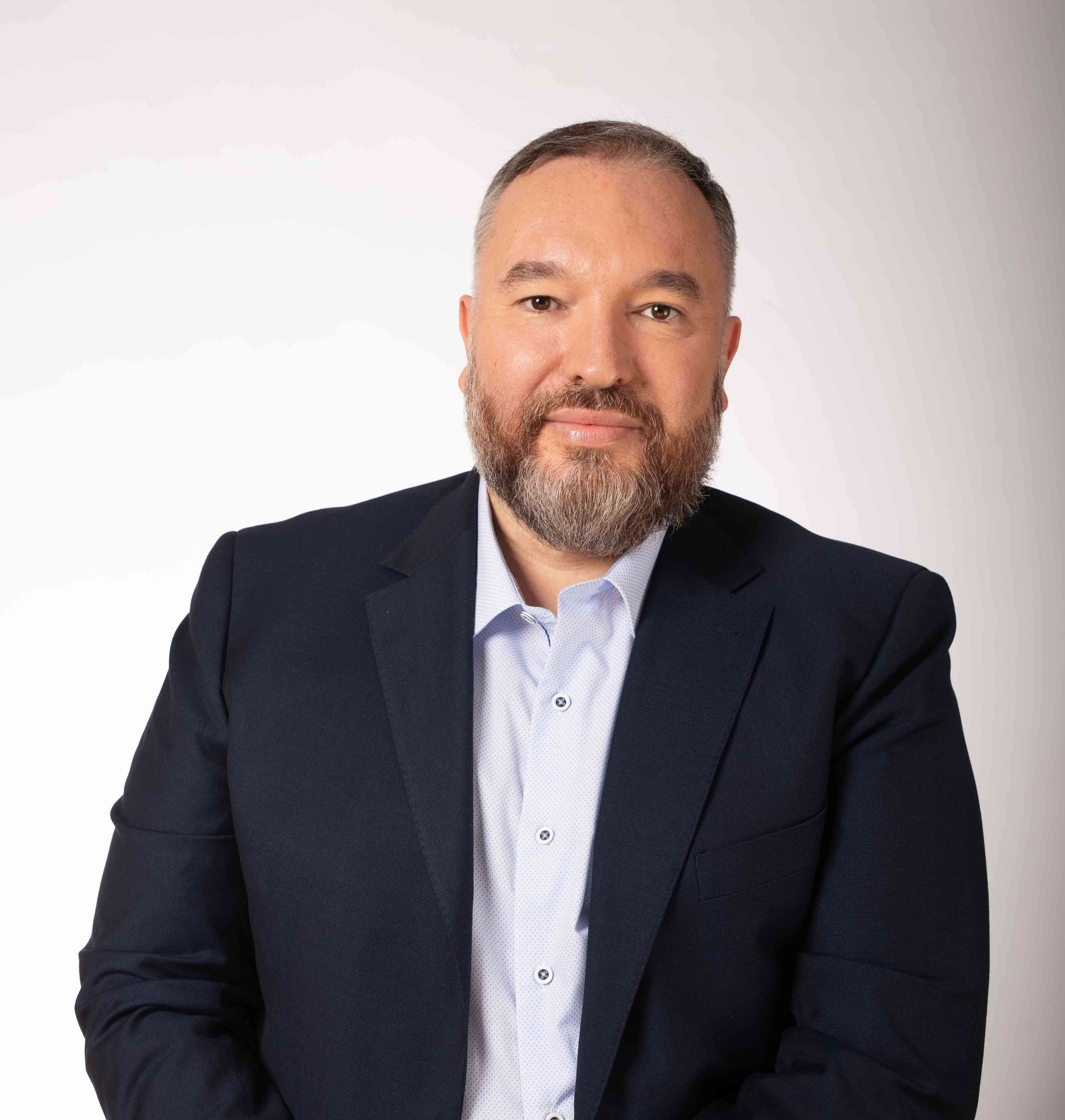
- Born: January 4, 1979 (age 47); Barcelona
- Citizenship: Spanish
- Education: PhD in Physics
- Alma mater: University of Barcelona
- Known for: Tensor Network States, Infinite PEPS, many-body entanglement, quantum computing, quantum artificial intelligence, physics of language
- Awards: Physics, Innovation, and Technology Award from the Royal Spanish Society of Physics and the BBVA Foundation (2024); Early Career Award from the European Physical Society (2014); Marie Sklodowska-Curie Action (2009); Honorable Mention in the Václav Votruba Award (2008).
- Scientific career
- Workplaces: Donostia International Physics Center; Multiverse Computing
- Thesis: Entanglement, quantum phase transitions and quantum algorithms
- Doctoral advisor: José Ignacio Latorre Sentís

Román Orús Lacort (Barcelona, 1979) is a Spanish theoretical physicist who specializes in quantum information science and quantum tensor networks. He is Ikerbasque Research Professor at the Donostia International Physics Center (DIPC), as well as co-founder and Chief Scientific Officer of Multiverse Computing.

== Education and career ==
Román Orús studied physics at the University of Barcelona and was awarded his PhD from the same university in 2006 under the supervision of José Ignacio Latorre, receiving special honours for both his undergraduate and doctoral degrees. He subsequently worked as a researcher at the University of Queensland (Brisbane, Australia) with Guifré Vidal, and at the Max Planck Institute for Quantum Optics (Garching, Germany) with Ignacio Cirac. He was appointed Junior Professor of Condensed Matter Physics at Johannes Gutenberg University (Mainz, Germany) in 2013, and Ikerbasque Research Professor at the DIPC (San Sebastián, Spain) in 2017, at the age of 38. He was also a visiting professor at the CNRS (Toulouse, France) and the DIPC.

== Scientific work ==
Orús is the author of numerous scientific papers on quantum technologies, including seminal contributions to complex quantum systems, applied quantum computing and quantum artificial intelligence. Orús's doctoral thesis was the first in Spain to focus on quantum algorithms, linking them to quantum phase transitions. During his time in Australia, he pioneered, alongside G. Vidal, I. Cirac, F. Verstraete and J. Jordan, the use of tensor networks to study two-dimensional quantum systems at the thermodynamic limit, and, together with G. Vidal, proposed a directional algorithm using corner transfer matrices.

In 2013, he single-handedly wrote an introductory and review article on tensor networks which became one of the most cited and well-known references in the field, subsequently writing other articles along the same lines. Orús also achieved significant results on many-body quantum entanglement, including the discovery, with T.-Chieh Wei, O. Buerschaper and M. van den Nest, of the topological correction in the geometric entanglement of systems with topological order.

In 2018, he co-authored a paper with S. Mugel and E. Lizaso on the practical applications of quantum computing in finance, which had a profound impact on the financial industry, and led to the creation of Multiverse Computing. Orús has also made significant contributions at the intersection of physics and linguistics, such as the connection between language and renormalisation, and the introduction of matrix models and vector spaces to describe syntax. He has also proposed the use of tensor networks for the efficient implementation of artificial intelligence models, including the compression of large language models (LLMs) such as ChatGPT, as well as variational quantum algorithms to break symmetric-key ciphers such as Blowfish and AES.

== Awards ==
Orús has received various awards for his scientific work, including an Honourable Mention in the Václav Votruba Prize (2008), a Marie Curie International Return Fellowship (2009), the European Physical Society's Early Career Award (2014), which he shared with Ian Chapman, and the Physics, Innovation and Technology Prize from the Royal Spanish Society of Physics and the BBVA Foundation (2024).

He has also been appointed a member of the United Nations Independent International Scientific Panel on Artificial Intelligence (2026). Established by the United Nations General Assembly, this global panel brings together leading experts to promote an evidence-based dialogue on the opportunities, risks and social impact of AI.

== Entrepreneurial career ==
Together with Enrique Lizaso, Samuel Mugel, and Alfonso Rubio, Orús co-founded Multiverse Computing in 2019, a company focused on the industrial applications of early prototypes of quantum computers. The project originated from a working group within the Quantum World Association. Multiverse Computing was incorporated as a company in March 2019 in San Sebastián (Spain), from the outset receiving support from local authorities as well as from DIPC and BIC-Gipuzkoa.

In 2020, the company graduated from the quantum program of the Creative Destruction Lab (CDL) in Toronto, and quickly became one of the world's largest quantum computing and artificial intelligence software companies, having closed several funding rounds, including a $215M Series B closed in June 2025. Multiverse has received several awards, including the "Manuel Laborde Werlinden Award" (2019), "Toribio Echevarria Award" (2019), "ADEGI New Company of Gipuzkoa Award" (2022), and was also a finalist for the "Emprendedor XXI Award" (2020). The company also received the "Future Unicorn Award" (2024) from Digital Europe, was selected by Indra to contribute to the Future Combat Air System (FCAS) project, received the "National SME of the Year Award for Innovation and Digitalization – Honorable Mention" (2024), and was recognized by CB Insights as one of the most promising companies in the world in artificial intelligence. It was also named one of the 100 fastest-growing startups in Southern Europe in 2025 by Sifted Multiverse is also among the Spanish entities filing the most European patents, ranking fifth in 2022 and third in 2023 only behind the Spanish National Research Council (CSIC) and Amadeus. The scientific developments of Orús are the foundation of the AI compression technology developed by Multiverse and validated by tech giants such as AWS

== Other activities ==
Orús is a member of the board of directors of Innobasque, a member of the editorial board of Quantum magazine, editor of Symmetry magazine, a member of the Quantum for Quants committee of the Quantum World Association, a partner at Entanglement Partners, a member of the Scientific Committee of the Pedro Pasqual Benasque Science Centre (CCBPP) and former chair of the Specialised Group on Quantum Information of the Royal Spanish Society of Physics. He has also co-organised numerous international conferences on quantum technologies and related topics, serves as a reviewer and advisor for various scientific journals and institutions, and regularly participates in science outreach activities.

== See also ==
- Tensor network
- Quantum computing
- Quantum entanglement
- Phases of matter
