= Chin-Sen Ting =

Taiwanese-American condensed matter physicist

- Citizenship: American
- Occupations: Physicist and an academic

Academic background
- Education: National Taiwan University (BS); National Tsing Hua University (MS); University of California, San Diego (PhD)

Academic work
- Institutions: University of Houston

Chin-Sen Ting is a Taiwanese-American physicist, He is a distinguished professor of physics at the University of Houston.

Through his research, Ting has explored condensed matter theories in semiconductors, magnetism, superconductivity, and correlated electron systems, focusing on solid state systems using methods like diagrammatic many body theory and Monte Carlo simulations. His works have been published in academic journals, including Physical Review B and Physical Review Letters.

== Education ==
Ting earned a Bachelor of Science degree from National Taiwan University in 1961, a Master of Science degree from National Tsing Hua University in 1965, and a Ph.D. in Physics from the University of California, San Diego in 1970.

== Career ==
Ting served as a postdoctoral research associate at New York University and Brown University from 1970 to 1976. Subsequently, he joined the University of Houston in 1976, where he held positions as assistant professor and associate professor until 1985. Since 1985, he has been a professor of physics at the University of Houston.

== Research ==
Ting's research in physics explores areas of theoretical condensed matter physics, electronic transport, superconductivity, spintronics, and magnetism. His Ph.D research in 1970 was to study the magnetic susceptibility of a magnetic impurity in a metal. He employed the pseudo-spin diagrammatic approach in one-loop approximation and obtained a self-consistent equation, from which the temperature-dependent can be numerically obtained from high to low temperatures. In 1970, he published an article with his Ph.D advisors on effect of short-wavelength components of the electronic polarizability on the transition temperature of superconductors. During the period (1970–1974) at New York University as a postdoc, his research efforts were on optical property of solids and superconductivity in A-15 compound. At Brown University as a second postdoc, he studied the many body effect in two-dimensional interacting electron gas, demonstrating that the predicted electron mass as a function of electron density was in good agreement with experiments.

The early work of Ting's academic career at the University of Houston in 1985 introduced a Green's-function approach to nonlinear electronic transport in electron-impurity-phonon systems under strong electric fields. By introducing an electron temperature concept, he investigated energy transfer rates and resistivity in various scattering processes, providing insights into electron cooling phenomena at low impurity concentrations.

In 1991, Ting's group developed a unified theory of the mixed-state Hall effect in type-II superconductors. This model, incorporating thermal fluctuations and the backflow effect, explained experimental observations, including scaling behavior and sign reversals in high-temperature superconductors. The 1995 work he did with his postdocs focused on d-wave superconductors, deriving Ginzburg-Landau equations microscopically and uncovering unique vortex structures, such as the induction of opposite-winding s-wave components near vortex cores. This study revealed strong anisotropy and complexity in the vortex behavior of unconventional superconductors.

In 1997, Ting's group proposed a localization model comprising spin disorder and nonmagnetic randomness was presented to account for novel magneto-transport property in Mn oxides 𝑅_{1−𝑥}𝐴_{𝑥}MnO_{3}. Using the transfer matrix method, the variable-range hopping resistivity was calculated as a function of temperature and magnetic field. The resulting sharp resistivity peak near the Curie temperature and in particular, the magnitude of the colossal negative magnetoresistance was in good agreement with experimental measurements.

Ting's group explored the spin-Hall effect in two-dimensional systems with Rashba spin-orbit coupling and disorder in 2005. Employing numerical calculations, he demonstrated the dependence of spin-Hall conductance on various parameters and revealed its persistence in metallic regimes, offering critical insights into spintronic phenomena. In 2010, his group studied the coexistence of spin-density wave (SDW) and superconductivity in electron-doped iron pnictides, revealing doping-dependent phase diagrams, Fermi surface evolution, and experimentally consistent asymmetries in coherence peaks. Later in 2015, he collaborated with experimentalists who reported the observation of robust zero-energy bound states in the iron-based superconductor Fe(Te,Se). This work linked these states to unconventional superconducting properties and possible Majorana bound states, pushing forward the understanding of topological superconductors and their scattering mechanisms.

By 2019, Ting was one of the authors who studied the Kondo physics of a magnetic impurity in two-dimensional topological superconductors (TSCs), either intrinsic or induced on the surface of a bulk topological insulator. Using a numerical renormalization group technique, they showed that, despite sharing the p +ip pairing symmetry, intrinsic and extrinsic TSCs host different physical processes that produce distinct Kondo signatures. Two years later, his group explored the extended spin-1/2 honeycomb XY model using density matrix renormalization group theory, revealing the emergence of chiral spin liquids under magnetic frustration and chiral interactions, thereby advancing the understanding of non-magnetic phases with topological order and their connections to conformal field theories.

Employing the density functional theory, Ting's group in 2022 showed that the fully hydrogenated monolayer-hexagonal boron nitride (H2BN) has a direct band gap of 3eV with stable phonon dispersions at low hole doping. Using the Eliashberg theory, they predicted that it is a phonon-mediated superconductivity with a transition temperature ~30K at the doping level of 1.5 × 10^{14} holes/cm^{2}.

In 2023, Ting and collaborators explained the distinct ferromagnetic and antiferromagnetic behaviors of semi hydrogenated and semi fluorinated graphene using a tight-binding model, highlighting how differences in bandwidth influenced their magnetic properties and could be tuned via electric fields.

== Awards and honors ==
- 1999 – Fellow, American Physical Society

== Selected articles ==
- Ting, C. -S.; Frankel, M. J.; Birman, J. L. (15 November 1975). "Electrodynamics of bounded spatially dispersive media: The additional boundary conditions". Solid State Communications. 17 (10): 1285–1289. doi:10.1016/0038-1098(75)90688-2. ISSN 0038-1098.
- Ting, C. S.; Ying, S. C.; Quinn, J. J. (15 December 1977). "Theory of cyclotron resonance of interacting electrons in a semiconducting surface inversion layer". Physical Review B. 16 (12): 5394–5404. doi:10.1103/PhysRevB.16.5394.
- Ting, C. S.; Talwar, D. N.; Ngai, K. L. (6 October 1980). "Possible Mechanism of Superconductivity in Metal-Semiconductor Eutectic Alloys". Physical Review Letters. 45 (14): 1213–1216. doi:10.1103/PhysRevLett.45.1213.
- Chen, L. Y.; Ting, C. S. (15 February 1991). "Theoretical investigation of noise characteristics of double-barrier resonant-tunneling systems". Physical Review B. 43 (5): 4534–4537. doi:10.1103/PhysRevB.43.4534.
- Xu, J. H.; Shen, J. L.; Miller, J. H.; Ting, C. S. (31 October 1994). "Superconducting Pairing Symmetry and Josephson Tunneling". Physical Review Letters. 73 (18): 2492–2495. doi:10.1103/PhysRevLett.73.2492.
- Weng, Z. Y.; Sheng, D. N.; Chen, Y.-C.; Ting, C. S. (1 February 1997). "Phase string effect in the t-J model: General theory". Physical Review B. 55 (6): 3894–3906. arXiv:cond-mat/9612040. doi:10.1103/PhysRevB.55.3894.
- Zhu, Jian-Xin; Friedman, B.; Ting, C. S. (1 April 1999). "Spin-polarized quasiparticle transport in ferromagnet–𝑑-wave-superconductor junctions with a {110} interface". Physical Review B. 59 (14): 9558–9563. doi:10.1103/PhysRevB.59.9558.
- Zhu, Jian-Xin; Ting, C. S. (18 September 2001). "Quasiparticle States at a 𝑑-Wave Vortex Core in High- 𝑇𝑐 Superconductors: Induction of Local Spin Density Wave Order". Physical Review Letters. 87 (14) 147002. arXiv:cond-mat/0105417. doi:10.1103/PhysRevLett.87.147002.
- Sheng, L.; Sheng, D. N.; Ting, C. S.; Haldane, F. D. M. (19 September 2005). "Nondissipative Spin Hall Effect via Quantized Edge Transport". Physical Review Letters. 95 (13) 136602. arXiv:cond-mat/0506589. doi:10.1103/PhysRevLett.95.136602.
- Lu, Hong-Yan; Cuamba, Armindo S.; Lin, Shih-Yang; Hao, Lei; Wang, Rui; Li, Hai; Zhao, YuanYuan; Ting, C. S. (15 November 2016). "Tilted anisotropic Dirac cones in partially hydrogenated graphene". Physical Review B. 94 (19) 195423. doi:10.1103/PhysRevB.94.195423.
