= Guifré Vidal =

Spanish physicist

- Born: Barcelona
- Education: Universitat de Barcelona
- Known for: Time-evolving block decimation, Tensor network states, Entanglement renormalization W state
- Scientific career
- Fields: Physicist
- Workplaces: Perimeter Institute, University of Queensland
- Doctoral advisor: Rolf Tarrach
- Other academic advisors: Ignacio Cirac, John Preskill

Guifré Vidal is a Spanish physicist who is working on quantum many-body physics using analytical and numerical techniques. In particular, he is one of the leading experts of tensor network state implementations such as time-evolving block decimation (TEBD) and multiscale entanglement renormalization ansatz (MERA). He was previously a faculty member of Perimeter Institute in Waterloo, Canada. However as of September 2019, he is now a research scientist at Sandbox @ Alphabet.
