= Multiverse Computing =

Quantum computing company

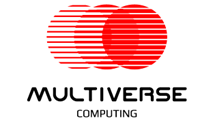
- Industry: Software
- Founded: 2019; 7 years ago
- Headquarters: San Sebastián, Spain
- Key people: Enrique Lizaso, Román Orús, Alfonso Rubio, Sam Mugel
- Products: CompactifAI and Singularity
- Number of employees: 480 (2026)
- Website: multiversecomputing.com

Multiverse Computing is a software company headquartered in San Sebastián, Spain, with offices in Madrid, Barcelona, Zaragoza, Paris, Munich, London, Milan, Toronto and San Francisco. The company develops compressed AI models and quantum software.

The AI model compression platform, CompactifAI, delivers compressed AI models by applying tensor network techniques. With its AI model compression technology, the company offers compressed and optimized versions of leading AI models from providers such as OpenAI, Meta, Microsoft, Qwen, DeepSeek or Mistral.

It also offers proprietary open-source AI models such as HyperNova 60B available on HuggingFace.

== History ==
Multiverse was co-founded in 2019 by Enrique Lizaso, Román Orús, Alfonso Rubio-Manzanares and Sam Mugel. Lizaso, treasurer and member of the governing board of the European Quantum Industry Consortium, and Orús, Ikerbasque Research Professor at Donostia International Physics Center and former Marie Curie Fellow at the Max Planck Institute of Quantum Optics, were chatting on WhatsApp when the idea for a quantum computing company for finance was born.

In 2021, the company announced €12.5 million in funding from the European Innovation Council (EIC) Accelerator program. This was followed by a €25 million funding round in 2024, valuing the startup at €100 million. Later that year, the startup was selected by the EIC’s Scaling Club – with a budget of $10 billion – as one of 48 companies to receive support with funding, mentoring and partnership matchmaking.

In April 2022, the company partnered with the Bank of Canada to explore how quantum computing can simulate cryptocurrency adoption. This research made Canada the first G7 country to explore the model of complex networks and cryptocurrencies through quantum computing. That July, Multiverse partnered with Bosch to integrate quantum algorithms into digital twin simulation workflow to scale simulations more efficiently and improve the accuracy of defect detection. Later that year, BASF used Multiverse’s Singularity to develop models for foreign exchange trading optimization between U.S. and EU currency.

Additional organizations exploring Multiverse’s quantum software include BBVA, Crédit Agricole CIB, and Repsol. In 2022, Gartner recognized Multiverse Computing as a “Gartner Cool Vendor” for offering “quantum software technologies and services that enable integration of quantum solutions exploration in the financial services industry.” Today, Multiverse is one of the largest quantum software companies in the world and has raised over €127.3 million.

The company launched CompactifAI, their AI model compression technology in 2023.

In September 2024 the company was selected by Amazon Web Services (AWS) for their global 2024 AWS Generative AI Accelerator.

Multiverse Computing closed their $215M Series B investment round in June 2025. The Series B was led by Bullhound Capital, HP Tech Ventures, SETT, Forgepoint Capital International, CDP Venture Capital, Santander Climate VC, Toshiba, and Capital Riesgo de Euskadi — Grupo SPRI also participated in the round. The new investment was focused on scaling CompactifAI compressed AI models, which are highly-compressed versions of leading open source LLMs that retain original accuracy, are 4x-12x faster and yield a 50%-80% reduction in inference costs. These compressed, affordable, energy-efficient models can run on the cloud, on private data centers or -in the case of ultra compressed LLMs- directly on devices such as PCs, phones, cars, drones and even Raspberry PI.

== Technology ==
Multiverse Computing’s algorithms have been implemented across verticals such as energy, manufacturing, logistics, finance, chemistry, space, and cybersecurity. In addition to quantum machine learning and optimization algorithms, the company uses quantum-inspired tensor networks to improve efficiency in solving industrial challenges. Tensor networks are used to model quantum systems, specifically quantum systems of many particles, and more recently are being applied to model artificial intelligence systems.

In 2023, the company launched CompactifAI, software that utilizes these networks to reduce the computational costs and energy requirements of training and operating large language models (LLMs). By minimizing size, memory, and storage needs of the models, the tensor networks can enhance efficiency and portability of these models.

In 2024, the company secured a $1.4M contract with the German Aerospace Center to develop single photon detectors with applications ranging from quantum computing to deep-space communication and bio-imaging.

In 2025, Multiverse Computing launched compressed Llama 3.1 8B and Llama 3.3 70B AI models. Both models have 60% fewer parameters than the original models, 84% greater energy efficiency, 40% faster inference, and yield a 50% cost reduction without sacrificing accuracy. AI developers can plug the models into any application – edge, on-premise, or cloud. The advanced capabilities of these two massive models are able to fit into smartphones, laptops, and cars, or real-world machines like oil rigs and satellites.

The company also created CompactifAI API available on AWS marketplace providing a robust, serverless LLM access layer that leverages AWS Sagemaker Hyperpod to scale the ultra-efficient compressed models inference across a cluster of hundreds of cutting edge GPUs. As a member of the AWS Generative AI Accelerator Program for 2024, Multiverse worked closely with AWS, providing users with access to a diverse range of optimized large language models such as Meta Llama, DeepSeek and Mistral compressed models, tailored to various performance and cost requirements.

In August 2025, Multiverse Computing released its first nano models, SuperFly and ChickenBrain. SuperFly is a compressed version of the open-source model SmolLM2 135. It has 94M parameters and is so minuscule that it can reside within the tiny neural architecture of two common flies (15,000 times smaller than a chicken brain). Despite its compact size, the model maintains conversational fluency similar to larger AI systems. Super Fly’s small footprint makes it possible to run locally on any device without requiring internet connection. For example, SuperFly can be installed locally on a device such an iPhone, and it can run questions with no internet connection.

ChickenBrain is a compressed version of Meta’s Llama 3.1 model. This nano model with reasoning capabilities could theoretically run on hardware the size of a chicken’s brain (3,700 times smaller than what is typically required). When tested on a MacBook Pro and Raspberry Pi, ChickenBrain exceeded the performance of Llama 3.1 8B across benchmarks—MMLU Pro, MATH500, GSM8K, and GPQA Diamond.

The company is also able to delete the censorship and limits on AI models as shown with a compressed and uncensored version of DeepSeek R1. Researchers at Multiverse Computing were able to delete the biases of the model and make it share political answers with no limitations.

In 2026, Multiverse Computing has launched its first open-source AI model, HyperNova 60B. At 32GB, HyperNova 60B is roughly half the size of the model it derives from OpenAI’s gpt-oss-120b while boasting lower memory usage and lower latency. The updated version, called HyperNova 60B 2602, now also better supports tool calling and agentic coding, where inference costs can be high.

In March 2026, the company has released CompactifAI App an AI chat tool. The difference being that it includes Multiverse embedded Gilda, a model so small that it can run locally and offline.

== Awards ==
Multiverse Computing won the 2024 Future Unicorn award from DIGITALEUROPE, recognizing the company’s potential for digital transformation across cybersecurity, health and AI. The company was also selected as a top 100 most promising AI company in the world in quantum AI software by CB Insights in 2025.

In September 2025, the company was included on Fortune Magazine's Change the World list They also where selected as "Best Startup" at Disruptores award.

In 2025 the company was ranked 7th on the Sifted AI 100 list In 2026, Multiverse Computing won the TechTour 50 Growth Europe award in the digital category.
