= Céline Broeckaert =

Flemish writer and playwright (born 1981)

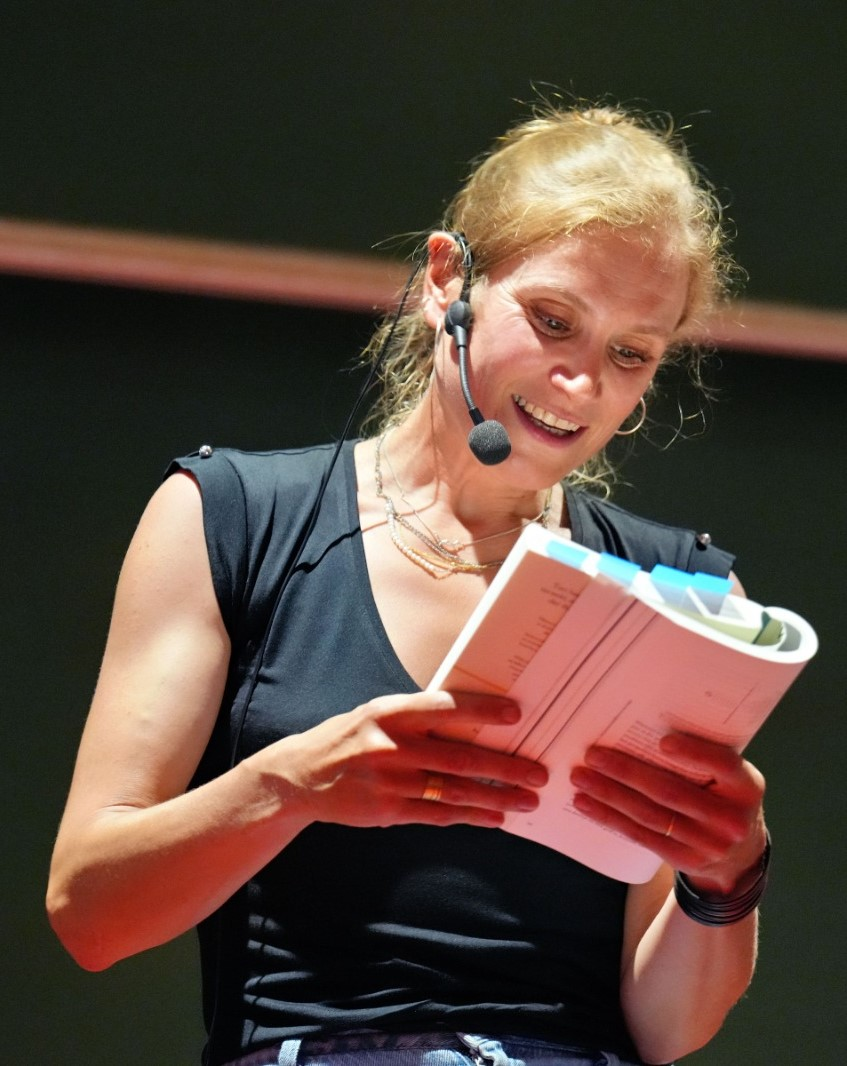
- Born: 9 January 1981 in Ghent, Belgium
- Occupations: Author, playwright, translator, and impact producer

Céline Broeckaert (born 9 January 1981 in Ghent) is a Flemish author, playwright, translator, and impact producer. She is known for addressing delicate and difficult themes in her performances (Three Voices – a Cancer Monologue (2017), It Is Another Year). Together with physicist Frank Verstraete, Broeckaert co-authored the popular science book Why Nobody Understands Quantum Physics – and Everyone Needs to Know Something About It (Pan Books). The English version of the book was launched at the Royal Institution, and it is also available in Dutch, French, German, Italian, Spanish, Korean, Russian, and simplified Chinese.
