= Steven R. White =

American physicist

- Born: December 26, 1959 (age 66); Lawton, Oklahoma
- Education: University of California, San Diego (BA); Cornell (PhD)
- Known for: Density Matrix Renormalization Group
- Scientific career
- Institutions: University of California, Irvine
- Doctoral advisor: Kenneth Wilson; John Wilkins

Steven R. White is a professor of physics at the University of California, Irvine. He is a condensed matter physicist who specializes in the simulation of quantum systems. He graduated from the University of California, San Diego; he then received his Ph.D. at Cornell University, where he was a shared student with Kenneth Wilson and John Wilkins.

He works mostly in condensed matter theory, specializing in computational techniques for strongly correlated systems. These strongly correlated systems include both high-temperature superconductors and quantum spin liquids. He is most known for inventing the Density Matrix Renormalization Group (DMRG) in 1992. This is a numerical variational technique for high accuracy calculations of the low energy physics of quantum many-body systems. His over one hundred seventy papers on this and related subjects have been used and cited widely—his most cited article has received over seven thousand citations.

== Awards ==
- National Science Foundation (NSF) Fellowship, 1982–1985
- Andrew D. White Supplementary Fellowship, 1982–1985
- IBM Postdoctoral Fellowship, 1988–1989
- American Physical Society, Fellow, 1998
- American Physical Society, Division Councilor for Computational Physics, 1999
- American Physical Society Aneesur Rahman Prize, 2003
- Fellow, American Association for the Advancement of Science (2008)
- Fellow, American Academy of Arts and Sciences (2016)
- Physical Review Letters Milestone Paper of 1992 (Honored 2008)
- Perimeter Distinguished Visiting Research Chair (2012–present)
- Member, National Academy of Sciences (2018)

== Most cited publications ==
- White, Steven R. (1992-11-09). "Density matrix formulation for quantum renormalization groups". Physical Review Letters. 69 (19): 2863–2866. Bibcode:1992PhRvL..69.2863W. doi:10.1103/physrevlett.69.2863. ISSN 0031-9007. PMID 10046608. Cited 2416 times, according to Web of Science, October, 2014; over 7000 citations, according to Google Scholar, February, 2023.
- White, Steven R. (1993-10-01). "Density-matrix algorithms for quantum renormalization groups". Physical Review B. 48 (14): 10345–10356. Bibcode:1993PhRvB..4810345W. doi:10.1103/physrevb.48.10345. ISSN 0163-1829. PMID 10007313. Cited 1598 times.
- Bickers, N. E.; Scalapino, D. J.; White, S. R. (1989-02-20). "Conserving Approximations for Strongly Correlated Electron Systems: Bethe-Salpeter Equation and Dynamics for the Two-Dimensional Hubbard Model". Physical Review Letters. 62 (8): 961–964. Bibcode:1989PhRvL..62..961B. doi:10.1103/physrevlett.62.961. ISSN 0031-9007. PMID 10040382. Cited 657 times.
