= Tensor network =

Graph representation in quantum mechanics

Graphical notation for the contraction $C_{ik}=\sum_j A_{ij}B_{jk}$: vertices denote tensors, an edge joining two vertices denotes the summed index $j$, and the open edges denote the free indices $i$ and $k$.

Diagrammatic representation of a matrix product state on twelve sites: every circle is a tensor A carrying one physical index (vertical leg, dimension d) and two virtual indices (horizontal legs, bond dimension D) that are contracted with the neighbouring tensors. The bond dimension controls the amount of entanglement the state can carry.

A tensor network is a representation of a high-dimensional array or multilinear map as a collection of smaller tensors whose indices are contracted according to a graph: vertices represent tensors, an edge joining two vertices represents an index that is summed over, and an open edge represents a free index of the resulting object; the dimension of an internal edge is called its bond dimension. Tensor networks can represent many-body wave functions and density operators, partition functions, Hamiltonians and other linear maps, probability distributions, and quantum circuits.

The usefulness of a tensor network representation rests on two pillars: compression and contraction. When the required bond dimensions remain moderate and the graph admits a favourable contraction order, the storage and computational costs can be exponentially smaller than for the explicit high-dimensional object. Neither condition holds in general — the required bond dimensions can grow rapidly, and the exact contraction of a general network is computationally intractable — so the power of the formalism lies in identifying the structured problems for which compression and contraction are both efficient.

Tensor network states are the special case in which a tensor network represents a variational wave function of a quantum many-body system — one of the principal settings in which the formalism was developed. The best-known examples are matrix product states (MPS) in one dimension, projected entangled pair states (PEPS) in two and higher dimensions, tree tensor networks (TTN), and the multiscale entanglement renormalization ansatz (MERA). Tensor networks provide the theoretical and computational framework underlying the density matrix renormalization group (DMRG), which effectively turned the simulation of quantum spin chains from a problem of exponential complexity into one of polynomial complexity, and remains widely used for simulating strongly correlated quantum systems.

A central idea behind tensor-network methods is that many physically relevant low-energy states of local quantum Hamiltonians occupy a comparatively small, weakly entangled part of the exponentially large many-body Hilbert space; in important settings their entanglement obeys an area law. Tensor network states are designed to efficiently parameterize such states: the entanglement between different regions is routed through auxiliary "virtual" indices whose dimension (the bond dimension) controls the amount of entanglement the ansatz can accommodate, and which serves as a systematically improvable refinement parameter. A second defining feature of the formalism is its diagrammatic calculus, descending from the graphical notation introduced by Roger Penrose, in which multilinear-algebraic manipulations are performed by deforming pictures of the network.

Beyond condensed matter physics, tensor networks are used in numerical multilinear algebra and scientific computing, fluid dynamics, quantum chemistry, quantum field theory and lattice gauge theory, classical statistical mechanics, probabilistic inference, quantum error correction, machine learning, and the classical simulation of quantum computers. In computational fluid dynamics, tensor-train and matrix-product-state representations have been used to compress and simulate turbulent flows and to represent high-dimensional turbulence probability distributions. In numerical analysis, tensor cross interpolation (TCI) constructs low-rank tensor-train or matrix-product-state representations by adaptively sampling selected entries of a high-dimensional tensor, with applications including multidimensional integration, partial differential equations, partition functions and matrix product operators. Tensor network contraction techniques have also been used to reproduce — and in several cases surpass — the results of leading quantum supremacy experiments on classical hardware.

== General ideas ==
The Hilbert space of a quantum many-body system grows exponentially with the number of its constituents: a lattice of $N$ spin-1/2 particles requires $2^N$ complex amplitudes for a complete description. A generic state in this space exhibits near-maximal entanglement between any subsystem and its complement. Ground states of local Hamiltonians are, however, far from generic. For gapped one-dimensional systems it has been proven that the entanglement entropy of a contiguous block saturates — an area law — rather than growing with the block size, and any state whose Rényi entanglement entropies scale at most logarithmically can be represented faithfully and efficiently as a matrix product state, with an error that can be controlled polynomially in the bond dimension. The precise conditions on entropy scaling under which such efficient approximability holds or fails have been delineated in detail. The idea that physical states occupy only a tiny corner of Hilbert space was made precise using tools of quantum information theory: the overwhelming majority of Hilbert space is physically inaccessible, and the full Hilbert space is in this sense a "convenient illusion". The program of constructing variational classes of states that parameterize precisely the physical, low-entanglement corner of Hilbert space — with the entanglement structure built in from the outset — was formulated in the original projected entangled pair states paper. By construction, the entanglement entropy of a region in an MPS or PEPS is bounded by the virtual bonds crossing its boundary, so these ansätze satisfy corresponding area-law bounds automatically.

The same considerations apply to the classical simulation of quantum circuits. Quantum circuits that generate limited amounts of entanglement — or whose geometry permits efficient contraction — can be simulated classically using tensor network methods, and those have become the standard tool for probing the claims of quantum supremacy experiments. Tensor network contraction algorithms have indeed been used to solve the sampling problem of Google's Sycamore random-circuit experiment on classical hardware, to perform a real-time simulation of the same circuits on the Sunway supercomputer (awarded the 2021 Gordon Bell Prize), and to reproduce and surpass, on modest classical resources, the results of IBM's 127-qubit "quantum utility" experiment.

== Graphical calculus ==
Tensor networks are almost universally manipulated in a diagrammatic notation that goes back to Penrose: a tensor is drawn as a shape with one leg per index, and the contraction of two indices is drawn by joining the corresponding legs. A matrix product state is then a chain of three-legged tensors, a PEPS a grid of five-legged tensors, an expectation value a closed ("fully contracted") diagram, and so on. Much of the power of the formalism resides in this graphical calculus: identities of multilinear algebra that would be opaque as nested index sums become topological deformations of a picture, and many key theorems — gauge freedom, canonical forms, transfer matrix manipulations, the behaviour of symmetries — are most naturally stated and proved diagrammatically. The same diagrams describe quantum circuits, quantum channels, and partition functions of classical statistical models, which is what allows concepts and algorithms to be transferred so easily among these settings.

A closely related but historically later development in quantum information theory is the ZX-calculus, a complete graphical rewrite system for qubit tensor networks generated by so-called Z- and X-spiders. The ZX-calculus can be regarded as a highly simplified species of tensor network, specialized to qubits and generated by a small set of spider tensors with phase parameters; within this restricted setting the diagrammatic rewrite rules can be made complete — complete axiomatisations are known for universal pure-qubit quantum mechanics as well as for important restricted fragments — and it is widely used for quantum circuit verification, optimization and fault-tolerance constructions.

== Common network geometries ==
The same graphical rules apply to many network topologies; the names in the following table distinguish the most common geometries and choices of open indices. The geometries differ not only in expressive power but also in contraction cost: chains and trees admit efficient exact contraction at fixed bond dimension, whereas networks containing large loops generally require approximate contraction.

Form	Graph and interpretation	Typical uses
Matrix product state (MPS) / tensor train (TT)	A chain of tensors, of rank three in the interior, with the physical or data indices left open	One-dimensional quantum states; compression of high-order arrays
Matrix product operator (MPO) / tensor-train operator	A chain with one input and one output index at each site	Hamiltonians, transfer matrices, density operators, channels
Tree tensor network (TTN)	A loop-free hierarchy of tensors combining the branches of a tree; closely related to the hierarchical Tucker format	Hierarchical correlations, multiscale approximation, high-dimensional numerical problems
Projected entangled pair state (PEPS)	Tensors on a two- or higher-dimensional lattice or general graph, with one physical index per site	Higher-dimensional quantum states; classical partition functions
Multiscale entanglement renormalization ansatz (MERA)	A layered network of isometries and disentanglers with a causal-cone structure	Critical systems; real-space renormalization
Continuous matrix product state (cMPS)	A continuum limit of the MPS construction	One-dimensional quantum fields

== History ==
=== Statistical mechanics origins ===
The prehistory of tensor networks lies in classical statistical mechanics. In 1941 Kramers and Wannier introduced the transfer matrix treatment of the two-dimensional Ising model together with a variational method for its leading eigenvector, based on a class of trial states that are recognizable in hindsight as precursors of matrix product states. In the language of the modern field, their transfer matrices are matrix product operators and their variational ansatz an MPS with a bond dimension equal to the physical dimension. Baxter developed these ideas much further, introducing the corner transfer matrix formalism and using matrix-product-like variational calculations to compute thermodynamic quantities of classical lattice models to high precision.

This variational transfer-matrix tradition was carried on through the 1970s: Kelland applied it to the Potts model, Tsang studied square-lattice variational approximations to the Ising model, and Baxter and Enting used corner transfer matrices to generate efficient series expansions; the corner transfer matrix formalism is treated in Baxter's classic monograph. Nightingale and Blöte generalized Baxter's variational method to quantum Hamiltonians, using a matrix-product-type trial state as the guiding function of a Monte Carlo computation of the Haldane gap of the spin-1 Heisenberg chain.

A separate thread originated with Wilson's numerical renormalization group (NRG), devised in the 1970s to solve the Kondo problem. It was understood only three decades later that NRG is itself a variational method within the class of matrix product states, which allowed its systematic improvement and unification with DMRG.

=== Matrix product states in mathematical physics ===
On the quantum side, Accardi introduced states of matrix product form in the early 1980s in his study of quantum Markov chains. The most famous matrix product state was written down by Affleck, Kennedy, Lieb and Tasaki (AKLT) in 1987, as a rigorous example supporting the Haldane conjecture for integer-spin Heisenberg chains; the same authors also constructed two-dimensional analogues that are now recognized as PEPS. Fannes, Nachtergaele and Werner realized that the AKLT state is one member of a vastly larger class, which they called finitely correlated states — injective matrix product states in modern terminology — and in a series of papers between 1989 and 1992 they developed the rigorous theory of these states, proving in particular that they arise as unique gapped ground states of local parent Hamiltonians. Klümper, Schadschneider and Zittartz used those ideas to construct exactly solvable spin chains and coined the term matrix product ground states.

=== Matrix product states in nonequilibrium statistical mechanics ===
Matrix product states were also discovered independently in classical nonequilibrium statistical mechanics. In 1993 Derrida, Evans, Hakim and Pasquier solved the open asymmetric simple exclusion process (ASEP) exactly by writing its nonequilibrium steady state as a matrix product, with boundary vectors encoding the injection and extraction rates. This matrix product ansatz became a cornerstone of exactly solvable nonequilibrium physics: steady states of a wide range of driven diffusive systems and reaction–diffusion models admit such representations, in which infinite-dimensional matrices satisfying quadratic algebras encode long-range correlations, boundary-induced phase transitions and shock profiles. A classical stochastic generator is a special (stochastic) matrix product operator, and the ASEP algebra is a representation of the same kind of quadratic algebra that appears in the quantum transfer matrices of integrable systems. This line of work anticipated, in an exact setting, the later use of variational MPS and DMRG methods for classical stochastic dynamics and driven quantum systems.

=== DMRG and its reinterpretation ===
In 1992 — the same year as the finitely correlated states paper of Fannes, Nachtergaele and Werner — White introduced the density matrix renormalization group, designed to cure the failures of Wilson-style real-space RG for lattice Hamiltonians, and it rapidly became the most accurate method available for one-dimensional quantum systems. DMRG had a major impact, effectively reducing the computational complexity of many quantum-spin-chain calculations from exponential to polynomial in the system size, and the landmark problems it solved are discussed in a separate section below. Nishino and Okunishi connected DMRG to Baxter's corner transfer matrices, obtaining the corner transfer matrix renormalization group (CTMRG) for two-dimensional classical systems. Östlund and Rommer recognized that the states produced by DMRG are matrix product states, and Dukelsky, Martín-Delgado, Nishino and Sierra established the equivalence of the variational matrix product method and DMRG.

=== The quantum information revolution ===
Around 2003 the field was transformed by an influx of ideas from quantum information theory, which supplied both the conceptual language (entanglement, area laws, fidelity) and a toolbox of new algorithms. Vidal devised an efficient scheme for classically simulating quantum computations that generate limited entanglement, which — reinterpreted for spin chains — became the time-evolving block decimation (TEBD) algorithm and equipped DMRG with real-time dynamics. Concurrently, work in 2004 took DMRG out of the realm of the renormalization group by recasting it as a variational optimization over the class of MPS, an interpretation that enabled many subsequent generalizations. In the same year, matrix product operators (MPO) and matrix product density operators were introduced, extending the formalism to finite-temperature and dissipative dynamics, and the two-dimensional generalization of MPS was constructed. PEPS were introduced in the context of measurement-based quantum computation, showing that the cluster state and related resource states are tensor networks and that measurement-based computation proceeds by steering a quantum circuit acting on the virtual entanglement degrees of freedom — an early demonstration that the virtual indices of a tensor network carry genuine computational and physical meaning. The companion paper formulated PEPS as a general variational family for two- and higher-dimensional quantum systems and provided the algorithms for optimizing them in the form of boundary-MPS methods.

=== Hierarchical tensor networks ===
A tree tensor network on sixteen sites: the physical indices sit at the leaves of the tree, and the successive layers implement a real-space coarse-graining terminating in a top tensor.

The multiscale entanglement renormalization ansatz (MERA): layers of disentanglers (squares) and isometries (triangles) implement a real-space renormalization group flow. Unlike a tree tensor network, the disentanglers remove short-range entanglement between neighbouring blocks before each coarse-graining step.

Vidal subsequently introduced the multiscale entanglement renormalization ansatz (MERA), a hierarchical tensor network incorporating disentanglers, designed to capture the scale invariance of critical systems and to realize a genuine real-space renormalization group flow on quantum states; practical algorithms were developed with Evenbly. Precursors of the underlying coarse-graining structure can be found in the strong-disorder renormalization group of Dasgupta and Ma. Tree tensor networks, hierarchical networks without disentanglers, were developed in parallel by several groups.

Essentially the same low-rank decompositions were later discovered in numerical mathematics: the tensor train decomposition of Oseledets is an MPS, and the hierarchical Tucker format of Hackbusch and Kühn is a tree tensor network. This has led to a large parallel literature on tensor decompositions and networks for high-dimensional problems in applied mathematics, signal processing and scientific computing.

=== Landmark results ===
The immediate impact of DMRG came from the problems it solved. Shortly after introducing the method, White and Huse computed the Haldane gap of the spin-1 Heisenberg chain to five-digit accuracy — and its ground-state energy per site to essentially machine precision — providing a high-precision numerical confirmation of the Haldane conjecture and setting a new standard of numerical accuracy for correlated lattice models.

The method was soon extended from static to dynamical properties, giving access to the spectral functions measured in neutron scattering and photoemission experiments: Hallberg introduced continued-fraction (Lanczos) techniques, Kühner and White developed the correction-vector method, and Jeckelmann reformulated the computation of spectral functions as a variational minimization — the dynamical DMRG — enabling momentum- and frequency-resolved spectra of strongly correlated chains with an accuracy rivalling experiment. The introduction of real-time evolution and of minimally entangled typical thermal states (METTS) for finite temperature extended the numerical toolbox.

DMRG on ladders and cylinders subsequently settled major open problems in two-dimensional physics. White and Scalapino discovered stripe order in the two-dimensional t–J model, a result central to the physics of the cuprate superconductors and later confirmed for the Hubbard model in a landmark multi-method benchmark. Yan, Huse and White produced the first strong numerical evidence for a spin-liquid ground state of the spin-1/2 kagome Heisenberg antiferromagnet, a milestone in the study of frustrated magnetism.

White also carried the method far beyond spin chains: with Martin he generalized DMRG to ab initio quantum chemistry by treating molecular orbitals as the sites of a fictitious lattice, a development pushed further by Legeza, by Chan and by Yanai and collaborators — the DMRG study of the notoriously multireference chromium dimer being an emblematic success — so that DMRG is now a standard tool for strongly correlated molecules and active spaces. Through the variational MPS reformulation of the numerical renormalization group, the same technology also subsumed and improved Wilson's treatment of quantum impurity problems.

== Algorithms ==
=== Matrix product state methods ===
DMRG remains the workhorse algorithm of the field. Although originally formulated in renormalization group language inspired by the numerical renormalization group, the modern view — expounded in the review "The density-matrix renormalization group in the age of matrix product states" — is that DMRG is an alternating least squares variational optimization over the MPS manifold, with only a loose connection to renormalization ideas. The corner transfer matrix renormalization group, rooted in Baxter's corner transfer matrices, plays the analogous role for two-dimensional tensor contractions and was later adapted to the contraction of infinite PEPS.

Real-time evolution can be performed with TEBD and its variants, while finite-temperature and dissipative dynamics use matrix product operators. Matrix product operators also give exact compact representations of local Hamiltonians themselves, including those with long-range interactions, a structure that can be understood in terms of finite-state automata. Several of these ingredients — MPS bond-dimension reduction, time evolution implemented by MPOs, and alternating least-squares sweeps — also appear in the original PEPS paper.

Continuous matrix product states (cMPS) extend the variational class to quantum fields in the continuum. Because Trotter-based methods such as TEBD rely on truncations that are ill-defined in the continuum limit and can break the symmetries of the ansatz, a time-dependent variational principle (TDVP) for cMPS was developed and later adapted to the usual MPS setting: time evolution is projected onto the tangent space of the variational manifold, yielding a symplectic flow on the (Kähler) manifold of MPS that exactly conserves energy and preserves symmetries. Combined with projector-splitting integrators developed in the numerical analysis community — where gauge choices are exploited to make the metric on the manifold effectively flat — this has become a widely used approach to MPS time evolution. For translation-invariant systems the VUMPS ("variational uniform matrix product states") algorithm optimizes uniform MPS directly in the thermodynamic limit.

These developments are unified by tangent-space methods, which treat the set of uniform MPS as a differentiable manifold embedded in Hilbert space. Elementary excitations are captured by the excitation ansatz — plane-wave superpositions of local perturbations of the ground state MPS — an idea whose roots go back to the earliest variational formulations of DMRG and which was made into a practical, quantitatively accurate method by tangent-space techniques, which have been extended to the computation of scattering matrices of these excitations.

The formalism extends beyond spin systems. Fermionic and graded tensor networks incorporate fermionic statistics directly at the level of the tensors. Matrix product states have been applied extensively to lattice gauge theories, beginning with precision studies of the Schwinger model and the explicit construction of gauge-invariant MPS. In quantum chemistry, DMRG applied to the orbital chain has become a standard tool for strongly correlated molecules (see the dedicated section below), and DMRG on cylinders is a leading method for two-dimensional lattice models.

=== DMRG for quantum chemistry ===
The generalization of DMRG to ab initio quantum chemistry treats the molecular orbitals of the full quantum chemical Hamiltonian as the sites of a one-dimensional lattice. Early independent implementations followed, and highly efficient polynomial-cost implementations soon delivered essentially exact (full configuration interaction quality) energies for small molecules. The dynamical block state selection protocol was introduced to control the truncation error and the use of quantum information measures — orbital entropies and mutual information — to order and select the orbitals has become standard practice. Further methodological milestones include spin-adapted formulations, efficient matrix product operator representations of the quantum chemical Hamiltonian, and hybrid schemes such as coupled cluster theory tailored by matrix product states.

Because its cost is insensitive to the multireference character of the wavefunction, DMRG opened active spaces of 50–100 orbitals — far beyond the reach of conventional complete active space methods — and thereby gave access to the electronic structure of polynuclear transition-metal complexes. Pioneering applications addressed the relative energies of transition-metal complexes and clusters, later work resolved the entangled electronic structure of the Mn_{4}CaO_{5} cluster of photosystem II, and DMRG calculations on the FeMo cofactor of nitrogenase — first used to define the benchmark problem for future quantum computers, then carried out in earnest for the FeMo cofactor and the P-cluster — mapped the low-energy landscape of the most demanding electronic structure problems in biochemistry. Mature open-source implementations include Block2, CheMPS2, and QCMaquis; the state of the field is surveyed in dedicated reviews.

=== PEPS methods ===
A projected entangled pair state (PEPS) on a 6×6 square lattice: each tensor carries one physical index (diagonal leg) and up to four virtual indices connecting it to its nearest neighbours, so that the entanglement entropy of any region automatically satisfies an area law.

The essential algorithmic toolbox for two-dimensional tensor networks involves the contraction of the network by boundary MPS, imaginary-time evolution implemented through MPOs acting on the PEPS (the "full update"), and variational sweeping by alternating least squares. Exact contraction of a generic PEPS is a computationally hard (#P-complete) problem, so all practical PEPS algorithms rest on approximate contraction; rigorous global error bounds are generally not available, and in practice the accuracy of an environment approximation is assessed by increasing its dimension and monitoring convergence. Contemporaneously with the original PEPS work, closely related tensor product variational formulations had been developed for three-dimensional classical statistical mechanics.

The extension to infinite, translation-invariant systems (iPEPS) followed soon afterwards. The "simple update", a cheap local truncation scheme, was introduced next, and CTMRG-based contraction was developed into the standard environment computation for iPEPS, including for fermionic systems. PEPS simulations of fermions encode the fermionic exchange signs algebraically in the tensors, and therefore do not encounter the statistical sign problem that plagues quantum Monte Carlo. Fermionic tensor networks were formulated directly, first for fermionic PEPS and fermionic entanglement renormalization, followed shortly afterwards by further formulations and simulations of strongly correlated fermions. Modern implementations are based on Grassmann or graded (super vector space) tensor networks.

Modern methods for variational iPEPS optimization include energy-gradient methods, made considerably more convenient by automatic differentiation borrowed from machine learning, and more recently by implicit (fixed-point) differentiation of the converged contraction equations, which avoids the memory overhead of unrolling the CTMRG iteration. Gradient-based optimization also enabled the accurate computation of excitation spectra of two-dimensional systems within PEPS. Alternative strategies include variational Monte Carlo sampling of PEPS, isometric tensor network states, and — less well controlled but highly scalable — contraction schemes based on belief propagation.

=== Tensor network renormalization ===
A very active line of research concerns real-space renormalization group algorithms that coarse-grain a two-dimensional tensor network — a partition function of a classical lattice model, or the norm of a PEPS — by locally truncating and recombining its tensors. The tensor renormalization group (TRG) introduced the basic coarse-graining step based on singular value decompositions, and was extended to a unified framework for symmetry-breaking and topological phase transitions. The truncations were improved by taking the environment of a tensor into account (second renormalization, SRG), and the higher-order singular value decomposition version (HOTRG) made the approach applicable to three-dimensional classical and two-dimensional quantum systems.

A conceptual shortcoming of plain TRG is that it fails to remove short-range entanglement at criticality, so that it does not produce a proper renormalization group flow with the correct fixed points. This was first addressed by an entanglement-filtering scheme — which also provided one of the earliest routes to symmetry-protected topological order — and solved systematically by tensor network renormalization (TNR), which inserts disentanglers in the coarse-graining step, and which was shown to generate the multiscale entanglement renormalization ansatz. Alternative formulations include loop optimization (loop-TNR), graph-independent local truncations (GILT), and the manifestly positive TNR+ scheme, which generates explicit renormalization group flows in the space of Hamiltonians, making direct contact with Kadanoff's spin blocking. At criticality these methods give direct numerical access to fixed-point tensors and to conformal data (central charge and scaling dimensions), and the approach has grown into a field of its own with applications ranging from three- and four-dimensional statistical mechanics to lattice field theory and quantum computing.

=== Contraction of arbitrary tensor networks ===
For tensor networks without a regular lattice structure — as arise in quantum circuit simulation, counting problems and probabilistic inference — the cost of contraction is governed by graph-theoretic properties of the network, in particular its treewidth. Efficient algorithms for identifying optimal or near-optimal contraction sequences have been developed, and hyper-optimized contraction planners based on hypergraph partitioning brought orders-of-magnitude further speedups. These techniques underpin the classical simulations of random quantum circuits, and these works have progressively closed the gap claimed by quantum supremacy experiments, as well as the tensor network simulations of IBM's error-mitigated dynamics experiments.

=== Finite entanglement scaling ===
At a quantum critical point the entanglement entropy diverges logarithmically, so no finite bond dimension MPS can represent the state exactly. Rather than a shortcoming, the finite bond dimension acts as a controlled infrared cutoff, analogous to a finite system size: it induces a finite correlation length, and critical properties can be extracted by scaling in the bond dimension (or in the induced correlation length), in direct analogy with finite-size scaling. The first such scaling analysis appeared in the corner-transfer-matrix context, the scaling of MPS entanglement at criticality was subsequently quantified, a theory of finite-entanglement scaling was formulated, the interplay of finite-size and finite-entanglement effects was analyzed, and a systematic scaling hypothesis unifying these approaches was put forward.

The same philosophy applies to PEPS in two dimensions, where finite correlation length scaling in iPEPS was established independently by two groups, and extended to a full scaling hypothesis for PEPS.

== Theory ==
=== Approximability and area laws ===
The mathematical justification for tensor network methods rests on approximability theorems. Early insight came from the study of the spectra of Baxter's corner transfer matrices: for integrable models these spectra — which are precisely the entanglement spectra probed by DMRG truncations — decay exponentially, explaining the remarkable accuracy of DMRG with small bond dimensions. The general statements are the proof that ground states of gapped local one-dimensional Hamiltonians satisfy such area laws, together with the faithfulness theorem — states whose Rényi entropies obey suitable area laws are efficiently approximated by MPS. Together these results establish that DMRG operates in a provably adequate variational class. Building on these structural insights, an algorithm has been constructed that provably finds the ground state of any gapped one-dimensional local Hamiltonian in polynomial time — even if the algorithm itself is not very practical. Area laws in higher dimensions and their relation to simulability are still open problems.

=== Canonical forms and the fundamental theorem of MPS ===
The map from tensors to states is not injective: different tensors can generate the same state. The canonical form of matrix product states fixes this gauge freedom, and the fundamental theorem of matrix product states asserts that any two tensors generating the same state are related by a local gauge transformation. This theorem underlies much of the structural theory of tensor networks. When a state is invariant under a physical symmetry, the theorem forces the symmetry to act on the virtual indices through (possibly projective) representations; this explains string order, the degeneracies in entanglement spectra of topological phases, and it underlies the complete classification of symmetry-protected topological (SPT) phases in one dimension, obtained independently by several groups.

=== Parent Hamiltonians and gaps ===
Every injective MPS is the unique ground state of a frustration-free, local, gapped parent Hamiltonian — the central result of the original papers on finitely correlated states. This construction reverses the usual logic of many-body physics: instead of solving a given Hamiltonian, one starts from a state with prescribed entanglement structure and builds Hamiltonians for which it is exact, the AKLT model being the paradigmatic example. These results establish that the manifold of injective MPS is in one to one correspondence with ground states of gapped quantum spin chains.

=== PEPS, topological order and bulk–boundary correspondence ===
For PEPS the virtual degrees of freedom acquire a richer role. A bulk–boundary correspondence has been established in which the entanglement spectrum of a region is described by a boundary Hamiltonian acting on the virtual indices along its edge — providing an explicit lattice realization of the entanglement Hamiltonian. Topological order manifests itself in PEPS not through any local order parameter but as a purely virtual symmetry of the local tensor: this has been formalized through the concept of G-injectivity, which yields topological ground-space degeneracy and anyonic excitations, and the generalization to matrix product operator (MPO) algebras — MPO-injectivity — captures all models in the same phase as string-nets and provides explicit tensor network representations of anyon fusion and braiding. The anyonic excitations of such phases appear in the tensor network as "shadows" — topological information carried by the virtual level that cannot be detected by any local operator. The same MPO algebras underlie the tensor network formulation of the strange correlator: overlapping a topological PEPS with a site-factorized product state — a diagnostic originally introduced for symmetry-protected phases — produces the partition function of a critical two-dimensional statistical model whose non-local topological symmetries are exactly the MPO algebra of the original state, thereby giving an explicit lattice mapping from topological to conformal field theories. A gauging map promotes global symmetries of tensor network states to local gauge symmetries at the level of the tensors, connecting SPT phases, topological phases and lattice gauge theories within a single constructive framework.

The algebras formed by matrix product operators have emerged as the natural lattice incarnation of generalized (categorical, non-invertible) symmetries. It has been shown that all dualities of one-dimensional quantum lattice models — including Kramers–Wannier, Jordan–Wigner and Kennedy–Tasaki transformations — are implemented by MPO intertwiners classified by (bi)module categories. Building on this, it was shown that every gapped phase of a one-dimensional system is dual to a symmetry-broken phase, that entanglement spectrum degeneracies are induced by the duality MPOs, and that simulating an optimally chosen dual model can substantially reduce the entanglement — and hence the cost — of DMRG simulations, placing symmetry-breaking, SPT and topological phases within a "generalized Landau paradigm".

== Applications beyond quantum many-body physics ==
Tensor networks are also used as low-rank representations in numerical multilinear algebra and scientific computing. In computational fluid dynamics, tensor-train and matrix-product-state representations have been used to compress and simulate turbulent flows and to represent high-dimensional turbulence probability distributions. In chemical reaction network theory, tensor trains have been used to compress the steady-state probability distributions of chemical master equations. In numerical analysis, tensor cross interpolation (TCI) constructs tensor-train or matrix-product-state representations by adaptively sampling selected entries of a high-dimensional tensor, with applications including multidimensional integration, partial differential equations, partition functions and matrix product operators. In classical statistical mechanics, partition functions and transfer matrices can be represented as tensor networks and evaluated or coarse-grained using methods such as CTMRG and tensor renormalization.

Tensor network contraction is an important approach for classically simulating quantum circuits, as described above. In machine learning, MPS/tensor-train models are used for supervised learning and generative modelling, and tensor decompositions are an established tool for dimensionality reduction and large-scale optimization in data analysis. Through an exact duality with probabilistic graphical models, tensor networks also provide a language for classical probabilistic inference. Tensor networks are used to decode quantum error-correcting codes, and in high-energy theory the observation that MERA realizes a discrete version of holography — with holographic quantum error-correcting codes as exactly solvable toy models of AdS/CFT — has motivated extensive use of tensor-network ideas in quantum gravity. In computational condensed matter physics, tensor network methods (DMRG and PEPS) set benchmark results for paradigmatic strongly correlated models such as the two-dimensional Hubbard model.

== Limitations ==
Tensor network methods do not evade the exponential complexity of generic quantum states and high-dimensional tensors.

- Bond-dimension growth. Generic states, and even physical states outside the area-law regime, may require exponentially large bond dimensions. In real-time quantum dynamics the linear growth of entanglement translates into an exponential growth of the required bond dimension, which limits simulations to moderate times.
- Contraction complexity. Networks with large treewidth generate exponentially large intermediate tensors, and the exact contraction of a generic PEPS is #P-complete.
- Optimization. The variational objectives are non-convex; local-update methods can converge slowly or get trapped in metastable solutions, so careful convergence checks in the bond dimension, environment dimension and initialization are required.
- Approximation control. Truncations based on the singular value decomposition carry a local discarded-weight measure, but the accumulated error of repeated truncations, and of approximate two-dimensional contractions, does not in general admit simple rigorous global bounds.
- Dependence on representation. The computational cost depends strongly on the site ordering, the graph geometry, the implementation of symmetries and the gauge of the tensors, so that reported performance can vary substantially between implementations.

== Open-source software ==
A rich ecosystem of open-source tensor network libraries is actively maintained. Prominent examples include ITensor, with C++ and Julia versions; TeNPy, a Python library; the Julia ecosystem built on TensorKit.jl, with MPSKit.jl for matrix product state algorithms and PEPSKit.jl for two-dimensional simulations; quimb, a Python library oriented towards arbitrary-geometry contraction and quantum circuit simulation; and YASTN for tensor networks with Abelian symmetries.

== See also ==
- Density matrix renormalization group
- Matrix product state
- Time-evolving block decimation
- Multiscale entanglement renormalization ansatz
- AKLT model
- Area laws for entanglement entropy
- ZX-calculus
- Tensor rank decomposition
- Penrose graphical notation
