= Orbital-free density functional theory =

Scientific theory

In computational chemistry, orbital-free density functional theory (OFDFT) is a quantum mechanical approach to electronic structure determination which is based on functionals of the electronic density. It is most closely related to the Thomas–Fermi model. Orbital-free density functional theory is, at present, less accurate than Kohn–Sham density functional theory models, but it has the advantage of being fast, so that it can be applied to large systems.

== Kinetic energy of electrons: an orbital-dependent functional ==
The Hohenberg–Kohn theorems guarantee that, for a system of atoms, there exists a functional of the electron density that yields the total energy. Minimization of this functional with respect to the density gives the ground-state density from which all of the system's properties can be obtained. Although the Hohenberg–Kohn theorems tell us that such a functional exists, they do not give us guidance on how to find it. In practice, the density functional is known exactly except for two terms. These are the electronic kinetic energy and the exchange–correlation energy. The lack of the true exchange–correlation functional is a well known problem in DFT, and there exists a huge variety of approaches to approximate this crucial component.

In general, there is no known form for the interacting kinetic energy in terms of electron density. In practice, instead of deriving approximations for interacting kinetic energy, much effort was devoted to deriving approximations for non-interacting (Kohn–Sham) kinetic energy, which is defined as (in atomic units)

$$T_S[\{\phi_{i}\}] = \sum_{i=1}^{N} \langle\phi_i|-\frac{1}{2}\nabla^2|\phi_i\rangle,$$

where $|\phi_i\rangle$ is the i-th Kohn–Sham orbital. The summation is performed over all the occupied Kohn–Sham orbitals.

== Thomas-Fermi (TF) kinetic energy ==
One of the first attempts to do this (even before the formulation of the Hohenberg–Kohn theorem) was the Thomas–Fermi model (1927), which wrote the kinetic energy as

$$T_\text{TF}[n] = \underbrace{\frac{3}{10} (3\pi^2)^{\frac{2}{3}}}_{C_{TF}} \int [n(\mathbf r)]^{\frac{5}{3}} \,d^3r.$$

This expression is based on the homogeneous electron gas (HEG) and a Local Density Approximation (LDA), thus, is not very accurate for most physical systems. By formulating Kohn–Sham kinetic energy in terms of electron density, one avoids diagonalizing the Kohn–Sham Hamiltonian for solving for the Kohn–Sham orbitals, therefore saving the computational cost. Since no Kohn–Sham orbital is involved in orbital-free density functional theory, one only needs to minimize the system's energy with respect to the electron density. An important bound for the TF kinetic energy is the Lieb-Thirring inequality.

== Von Weizsäcker (vW) kinetic energy ==
A notable historical improvement of the Thomas-Fermi model is the von Weizsäcker (vW) kinetic energy (1935), which is exactly the kinetic energy for noninteracting bosons and can be regarded as a Generalized Gradient approximation (GGA).

$$T_{\text{vW}}[n]=\frac{1}{8}\int \frac{\nabla n(\mathbf r)\cdot\nabla n(\mathbf r)}{n(\mathbf r)}d^{3}r=\int\sqrt{n(\mathbf r)}(-\frac{1}{2}\Delta)\sqrt{n(\mathbf r)}d^{3}r$$

== Pauli kinetic energy ==
A conceptually really important quantity in OFDFT is the Pauli kinetic energy. As the Kohn-Sham correlation energy links the real system of interacting electrons to the artificial Kohn-Sham (KS) system of noninteracting electrons, the Pauli kinetic energy links the KS system to the fictitious system noninteracting model bosons. In the same way as the KS interacting energy it is highly KS-orbital dependent and must be in practice approximated.

$$T_{\text{P}}[n]\equiv T_{\text{S}}[n]-T_{\text{vW}}[n]$$

The term Pauli comes from the fact, that the functional is related to the Pauli exclusion principle. $T_{\text{P}}[n]=0$ for an electron number of $N\leq 2$.

== Dirac exchange energy ==
The exchange energy in orbital-free density functional theory (OFDFT) is the Dirac exchange as a Local Density Approximation (LDA) (1930) It is related to the homogeneous electron gas (HEG).

$$E_{x}^{\text{LDA}}[n]=-\underbrace{\frac{3}{4}\bigg(\frac{3}{\pi}\bigg)^{1/3}}_{C_{x}}\int[n(\mathbf r)]^{\frac{4}{3}}d^{3}r$$

An important bound for the LDA exchange energy is the Lieb-Oxford inequality.

== Nonlocal kinetic energy density functionals (KEDF) ==
State-of-the-art kinetic energy density functionals for orbital-free density functional theory, and still under active research, are the so-called nonlocal (NL) kinetic energy density functionals. They admit the general form

$T_{\text{NL}}[n]=C_{\text{NL}}\iint n(\mathbf r)^{\alpha}K[n](\mathbf r, \mathbf r')n(\mathbf r')^{\beta} d\mathbf r d \mathbf r'$

where $K[n](\mathbf r, \mathbf r')$ is a nonlocal kernel depending on the electron density, and $C_{\text{NL}}$ is some constant. The kernel is often determined based on the linear response function of the uniform electron gas, which makes the KEDF highly accurate for simple metals. Efforts have also been made to extend the KEDF to semiconductors by designing the kernel based on the linear response function in these systems.

== Levy-Perdew-Sahni (LPS) equation ==
The analogue to the Kohn-Sham (KS) equations (1965) in Orbital-free density functional theory (OFDFT) is the Levy-Perdew-Sahni (LPS) equation (1984), an effectively bosonic Schrödinger equation

$$\bigg(-\frac{1}{2}\Delta+v_{S}(\mathbf r)+v_{P}(\mathbf r)\bigg)\sqrt{n(\mathbf r)}=\mu\sqrt{n(\mathbf r)}$$

where $v_{S}(\mathbf r)$ is the Kohn-Sham (KS) potential, $v_{P}(\mathbf r)$ the Pauli potential, $\mu$ the highest occupied KS orbital and $\sqrt{n(\mathbf r)}$ the square root of the density. One big benefit of the LPS equation being so intimately related to the KS equations is that an existing KS code can be easily modified in an OF code with ejecting all orbitals except for one in the Self-Consistent-Field (SCF) cycle.

=== Derivation ===
Starting from Euler–Lagrange equation of density functional theory $\frac{\delta T_{S}[n]}{\delta n(\mathbf r)}+v_{S}(\mathbf r)=\mu$, simultaneously adding and subtracting the von Weizsäcker potential, i.e. the functional derivative of the vW functional and acknowleding the definition of the Pauli kinetic energy, while the functional derivative of the Pauli kinetic energy with respect to the density is the Pauli potential $\underbrace{\frac{\delta T_{vW}[n]}{\delta n(\mathbf r)}}_{v_{vW}(\mathbf r)}+v_{S}(\mathbf r)+\underbrace{\frac{\delta T_{P}[n]}{\delta n(\mathbf r)}}_{v_{P}(\mathbf r)}=\mu$. Expanding the functional derivative via chain rule $\underbrace{\frac{\delta\sqrt{n(\mathbf r)}}{\delta n(\mathbf r)}}_{1/\sqrt{n(\mathbf r)}}\underbrace{\frac{\delta}{\delta\sqrt{n(\mathbf r)}}\int\sqrt{n(\mathbf r)}(-\frac{1}{2}\Delta)\sqrt{n(\mathbf r)}d^{3}r}_{-\frac{1}{2}\Delta\sqrt{n(\mathbf r)}}+v_{S}(\mathbf r)+v_{P}(\mathbf r)=\mu$ and as a last step multiplying both sides by the square root of the density $\sqrt{n(\mathbf r)}$ yields the LPS equation.

=== Bosonic transformation ===
With the linear transformation $\sqrt{n(\mathbf r)}\mapsto\frac{1}{\sqrt{N}}\phi_{B}(\mathbf r)$ and by defining the bosonic potential as $v_{B}(\mathbf r)\equiv v_{S}(\mathbf r)+v_{P}(\mathbf r)$ the LPS equation evolves to the bosonic Schrödinger equation

$\bigg(-\frac{1}{2}\Delta+v_{B}(\mathbf r)\bigg)\phi_{B}(\mathbf r)=\mu\phi_{B}(\mathbf r)$.

Note that the normalization constraint in Bra–ket notation $\langle\phi_{B}|\phi_{B}\rangle=1$ holds, since $N[n]=\int n(\mathbf r)d^{3}r$.

== Time-dependent orbital-free density functional theory (TDOFDFT) ==
Quite recently also a time-dependent version of OFDFT has been developed. It is also implemented in DFTpy.

== Software packages ==
A free open-source software package for OFDFT DFTpy has been developed by the Pavanello Group. It was launched in 2020. The most recent version is 2.1.1.
