= Optimized effective potential method =

Quantum-mechanical framework for simulating molecules and solids

The optimized effective potential method (OEP) in Kohn-Sham (KS) density functional theory (DFT) is a method to determine the potentials as functional derivatives of the corresponding KS orbital-dependent energy density functionals. This can be in principle done for any arbitrary orbital-dependent functional, but is most common for exchange energy as the so-called exact exchange method (EXX), which will be considered here.

== Origin ==
The OEP method was developed more than 10 years prior to the work of Pierre Hohenberg, Walter Kohn and Lu Jeu Sham in 1953 by R. T. Sharp and G. K. Horton in order to investigate, what happens to Hartree-Fock (HF) theory when, instead of the regular nonlocal exchange potential, a local exchange potential is demanded. Much later after 1990 it was found out that this ansatz is useful in density functional theory.

== Background via chain rule ==
In density functional theory the exchange correlation (xc) potential is defined as the functional derivative of the exchange correlation (xc) energy with respect to the electron density $\rho(r)$

$v_{xc}(r)\equiv\frac{\delta E_{xc}[\rho]}{\delta\rho(r)}=\frac{\delta E_{xc}[\{\phi_{s}\}]}{\delta\rho(r)}$	1

where the index $s$ denotes either occupied or unoccupied KS orbitals and eigenvalues. The problem is that, although the xc energy is in principle (due to the Hohenberg-Kohn (HK) theorem) a functional of the density, its explicit dependence on the density is unknown (only known in the simple Local density approximation (LDA) case), only its implicit dependence through the KS orbitals. That motivates the use of the chain rule

$v_{xc}(r)=\int dr'\sum_{s}\bigg[\frac{\delta E_{xc}[\{\phi_{s}\}]}{\delta\phi_{s}(r')}\frac{\delta\phi_{s}(r')}{\delta\rho(r)}+c.c.\bigg]$

Unfortunately the functional derivative $\delta\phi_{s}/\delta\rho$, despite its existence, is also unknown. So one needs to invoke the chain rule once more, now with respect to the Kohn-Sham (KS) potential $v_{S}(r)$

$v_{xc}(r)=\iint dr'dr''\sum_{s}\bigg[\frac{\delta E_{xc}[\{\phi_{s}\}]}{\delta\phi_{s}(r')}\frac{\delta\phi_{s}(r')}{\delta v_{S}(r'')}\underbrace{\frac{\delta v_{S}(r'')}{\delta\rho(r)}}_{\equiv X_{S}^{-1}(r,r')}+c.c.\bigg]$

where $X_{S}^{-1}(r,r')$ is defined the inverse static Kohn-Sham (KS) response function.

== Formalism ==
The KS orbital-dependent exact exchange energy (EXX) is given in Chemist's notation as

$E_{x}[\{\phi_{i}\}]=-\frac{1}{2}\sum_{i}\sum_{j}(ij|ji)\equiv -\frac{1}{2}\sum_{i}\sum_{j}\iint drdr'\frac{\phi_{i}^{\dagger}(r)\phi_{j}(r)\phi_{j}^{\dagger}(r')\phi_{i}(r')}{|r-r'|}$

where $r,r'$ denote electronic coordinates, $\dagger$ the hermitian conjugate.The static Kohn-Sham (KS) response function is given as

$X_{S}(r,r')\equiv\frac{\delta \rho(r)}{\delta v_{S}(r')}=\sum_{i}\sum_{a}\bigg[\frac{\phi_{i}^{\dagger}(r)\phi_{a}(r)\phi_{a}^{\dagger}(r')\phi_{i}(r')}{\varepsilon_{i}-\varepsilon_{a}}+c.c.\bigg]$	2

where the indices $i$ denote occupied and $a$ unoccupied KS orbitals, $c.c.$ the complex conjugate. the right hand side (r.h.s.) of the OEP equation is

$t(r)=\frac{\delta E_{x}[\{\phi_{i}\}]}{\delta v_{S}(r)}=\sum_{i}\sum_{a}\bigg[\frac{\phi_{i}^{\dagger}(r)\phi_{a}(r)\langle\phi_{a}|\hat{v}_{x}^{\text{NL}}|\phi_{i}\rangle}{\varepsilon_{i}-\varepsilon_{a}}+c.c.\bigg]$	3

where $\hat{v}_{x}^{\text{NL}}$ is the nonlocal exchange operator from Hartree-Fock (HF) theory but evaluated with KS orbitals stemming from the functional derivative $\delta E_{xc}[\{\phi_{i}\}]/\delta\phi_{i}(r')$. Lastly note that the following functional derivative is given by first order static perturbation theory exactly

$\frac{\delta\phi_{s}(r')}{\delta v_{S}(r'')}=\phi_{i}(r')\underbrace{\sum_{t, t\neq i}\frac{\phi_{t}^{\dagger}(r')\phi_{t}(r)}{\varepsilon_{i}-\varepsilon_{t}}}_{G(r,r')}$

which is a Green's function. Combining eqs. (1), (2) and (3) leads to the Optimized Effective Potential (OEP) Integral equation

$\int dr'v_{x}(r')X_{S}(r,r')=t(r)$

== Implementation with a basis set ==
Usually the exchange potential is expanded in an auxiliary basis set (RI basis) $\{f_{\mu}\}$ as $v_{x}(r)=\sum_{\nu}v_{x,\nu}f_{\nu}(r)$ together with the regular orbital basis $\{\chi_{\lambda}\}$ requiring the so-called 3-index integrals of the form $(f_{\nu}|\chi_{\lambda}\chi_{\kappa})$ as the linear algebra problem

$\textbf X_{\text{S}}\textbf v_{\text{x}}=\textbf t$

It shall be noted, that many OEP codes suffer from numerical issues. There are two main causes. The first is, that the Hohenberg-Kohn theorem is violated since for practical reasons a finite basis set is used, the second being that different spatial regions of potentials have different influence on the optimized energy leading e.g. to oscillations in the convergence from poor conditioning.
