= Harris functional =

In density functional theory (DFT), the Harris energy functional is a non-self-consistent approximation to the Kohn–Sham density functional theory. It gives the energy of a combined system as a function of the electronic densities of the isolated parts. The energy of the Harris functional varies much less than the energy of the Kohn–Sham functional as the density moves away from the converged density.

== Background ==
Kohn–Sham equations are the one-electron equations that must be solved in a self-consistent fashion in order to find the ground state density of a system of interacting electrons:

$$\left( \frac{-\hbar^2}{2m}\nabla^2+v_{\rm H}[n]+v_{\rm xc}[n] +v_{\rm ext}(r)\right)\phi_j(r)=\epsilon_j \phi_j(r).$$

The density, $n,$ is given by that of the Slater determinant formed by the spin-orbitals of the occupied states:

$$n(r)=\sum_{j} f_j \vert \phi_j (r)  \vert ^2,$$

where the coefficients $f_j$ are the occupation numbers given by the Fermi–Dirac distribution at the temperature of the system with the restriction $\sum_j f_j =N$, where $N$ is the total number of electrons. In the equation above, $v_{\rm H}[n]$ is the Hartree potential and $v_{\rm xc}[n]$ is the exchange–correlation potential, which are expressed in terms of the electronic density. Formally, one must solve these equations self-consistently, for which the usual strategy is to pick an initial guess for the density, $n_0(r)$, substitute in the Kohn–Sham equation, extract a new density $n_1(r)$ and iterate the process until convergence is obtained. When the final self-consistent density $n(r)$ is reached, the energy of the system is expressed as:

$$E[n] = \sum_{j \in \text{occupied}} \epsilon_j -\tfrac{1}{2}\int v_{\rm H}[n]n(r) \, \mathrm{d}r - \int v_{\rm xc}[n]n(r) \, \mathrm{d}r + E_{\rm xc}[n]$$.

== Definition ==
Assume that we have an approximate electron density $n_0( r)$, which is different from the exact electron density $n( r)$. We construct exchange-correlation potential $v_{\rm xc}(r)$ and the Hartree potential $v_{\rm H}(r)$ based on the approximate electron density $n_0(r)$. Kohn–Sham equations are then solved with the XC and Hartree potentials and eigenvalues are then obtained; that is, we perform one single iteration of the self-consistency calculation. The sum of eigenvalues is often called the band structure energy:

$$E_{\rm band}=\sum_i \epsilon_i,$$

where $i$ loops over all occupied Kohn–Sham orbitals. The Harris energy functional is defined as

$$E_{\rm Harris}[n_0] = \sum_i \epsilon_i - \int \mathrm{d}r^3 v_{\rm xc}[n_0](r) n_0(r) - \tfrac{1}{2} \int \mathrm{d}r^3 v_{\rm H}[n_0](r) n_0(r) + E_{\rm xc}[n_0]$$

== Comments ==
It was discovered by Harris that the difference between the Harris energy $E_{\rm Harris}$ and the exact total energy is to the second order of the error of the approximate electron density, i.e., $O((\rho-\rho_0)^2)$. Therefore, for many systems the accuracy of Harris energy functional may be sufficient. The Harris functional was originally developed for such calculations rather than self-consistent convergence, although it can be applied in a self-consistent manner in which the density is changed. Many density-functional tight-binding methods, such as CP2K, DFTB+, Fireball, and Hotbit, are built based on the Harris energy functional. In these methods, one often does not perform self-consistent Kohn–Sham DFT calculations and the total energy is estimated using the Harris energy functional, although a version of the Harris functional where one does perform self-consistency calculations has been used. These codes are often much faster than conventional Kohn–Sham DFT codes that solve Kohn–Sham DFT in a self-consistent manner.

While the Kohn–Sham DFT energy is a variational functional (never lower than the ground state energy), the Harris DFT energy was originally believed to be anti-variational (never higher than the ground state energy). This was, however, conclusively demonstrated to be incorrect.
