= Llewellyn Thomas =

British physicist and applied mathematician (1903–1992)

Llewellyn Hilleth Thomas
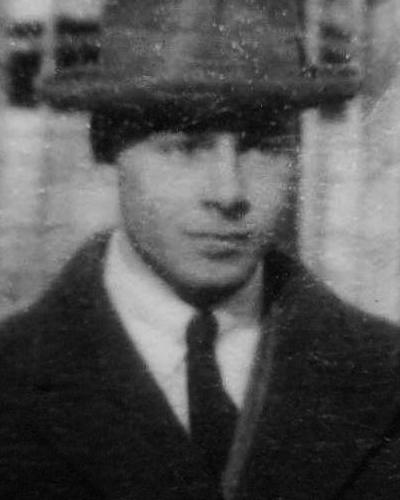
- Thomas in Copenhagen, 1926
- Born: 21 October 1903; London, United Kingdom
- Died: 20 April 1992 (aged 88); Raleigh, North Carolina, USA
- Known for: Thomas precession Thomas algorithm Thomas-Fermi model Thomas-Fermi screening Thomas-Fermi equation Spin–orbit interaction
- Awards: Smith's Prize (1925)
- Scientific career
- Thesis: Contributions to the theory of the motion of electrified particles through matter and some effects of that motion (1927)

Llewellyn Hilleth Thomas (21 October 1903 – 20 April 1992) was a British physicist and applied mathematician. He is best known for his contributions to atomic and molecular physics and solid-state physics. His key achievements include calculating relativistic effects on the spin-orbit interaction in a hydrogenic atom (Thomas precession), creating an approximate theory of $N$-body quantum systems (Thomas-Fermi theory), and devising an efficient method for solving tridiagonal system of linear equations (Thomas algorithm).

== Life and education ==
Born in London, he studied at Cambridge University, receiving his BA, PhD, and MA degrees in 1924, 1927 and 1928 respectively. While on a Traveling Fellowship for the academic year 1925–1926 at Bohr's Institute in Copenhagen, he proposed Thomas precession in 1926, to explain the difference between predictions made by spin-orbit coupling theory and experimental observations.

In 1929 he obtained a job as a professor of physics at the Ohio State University, where he stayed until 1943. He married Naomi Estelle Frech in 1933. In 1935 he was the master's thesis advisor for Leonard Schiff, whose thesis was published with Thomas as coauthor. From 1943 until 1945 Thomas worked on ballistics at the Aberdeen Proving Ground in Maryland. In 1946 he became a member of the staff of the Watson Scientific Computing Laboratory at Columbia University, remaining there until 1968. In 1958 he was elected as a member of the National Academy of Sciences. In 1963, Thomas was appointed as IBM's First Fellow in the Watson Research Center. He was appointed professor at North Carolina State University in 1968, retiring from this position in 1976. In 1982 he received the Davisson-Germer Prize. He died in Raleigh, North Carolina.

== Contributions ==
Thomas was responsible for multiple advances in physics. The Thomas precession is a correction to the atomic spin-orbit interaction in quantum mechanics, which takes into account the relativistic time dilation between the electron and the atomic nucleus. The Thomas–Fermi model is a statistical model for electron-ion interactions, which later formed the basis of density functional theory. The Thomas collapse is effect in few-body physics, which corresponds to infinite value of the three body binding energy for zero-range potentials.

In mathematics, his name is frequently attached to an efficient Gaussian elimination method for tridiagonal matrices—the Thomas algorithm.

== Notable publications ==
- Thomas, L. H. (1926). "The motion of the spinning electron". Nature. 117 (2945): 514. Bibcode:1926Natur.117..514T. doi:10.1038/117514a0.
- Thomas, L. H. (1927). "The calculation of atomic fields". Mathematical Proceedings of the Cambridge Philosophical Society. 23 (5): 542–548. Bibcode:1927PCPS...23..542T. doi:10.1017/S0305004100011683.
- Thomas, L. H. (1927). "The kinematics of an electron with an axis". Philosophical Magazine. Series 7. 3 (13): 1–22. doi:10.1080/14786440108564170.
- Thomas, L. H. (1930). "Radiation field in a fluid in motion". Quarterly Journal of Mathematics. 1 (1): 239–251. doi:10.1093/qmath/os-1.1.239.
- Thomas, L. H. (1935). "The interaction between a neutron and a proton and the structure of H^{3}". Physical Review. 47 (12): 903–909. Bibcode:1935PhRv...47..903T. doi:10.1103/PhysRev.47.903.
- Thomas, L. H. (1938). "The paths of ions in the cyclotron I. Orbits in the magnetic field". Physical Review. 54 (8): 580–588. Bibcode:1938PhRv...54..580T. doi:10.1103/PhysRev.54.580.
- Shaffer, W. H.; Nielsen, H. H.; Thomas, L. H. (1939). "The rotation-vibration energies of tetrahedrally symmetric pentatomic molecules. I". Physical Review. 56 (9): 895–907. Bibcode:1939PhRv...56..895S. doi:10.1103/PhysRev.56.895.
- Thomas, L. H. (1942). "A Practical Method for the Solution of Certain Problems in Quantum Mechanics by Successive Removal of Terms from the Hamiltonian by Contact Transformations of the Dynamical Variables Part I. General Theory". Journal of Chemical Physics. 10 (8): 532–537. Bibcode:1942JChPh..10..532T. doi:10.1063/1.1723760.
- Thomas, L. H. (1944). "Note on Becker's Theory of the Shock Front". Journal of Chemical Physics. 12 (11): 449–453. Bibcode:1944JChPh..12..449T. doi:10.1063/1.1723889.
- Sheldon, John; Thomas, L. H. (1953). "The use of large scale computing in physics". Journal of Applied Physics. 24 (3): 235–242. Bibcode:1953JAP....24..235S. doi:10.1063/1.1721257.
- Thomas, L. H. (1953). "The stability of plane Poiseuille flow". Physical Review. 91 (4): 780–783. Bibcode:1953PhRv...91..780T. doi:10.1103/PhysRev.91.780.
- Bakamjian, B.; Thomas, L. H. (1953). "Relativistic particle dynamics. II". Physical Review. 92 (5): 1300–1310. Bibcode:1953PhRv...92.1300B. doi:10.1103/PhysRev.92.1300.
- Thomas, L. H. (3 May 1954). "Satellite Countermeasures". Time.
- Thomas, L. H.; Umeda, K. (1957). "Atomic Scattering Factors Calculated from the TFD Atomic Model". Journal of Chemical Physics. 26 (2): 293–303. Bibcode:1957JChPh..26..293T. doi:10.1063/1.1743287.

== Gallery ==
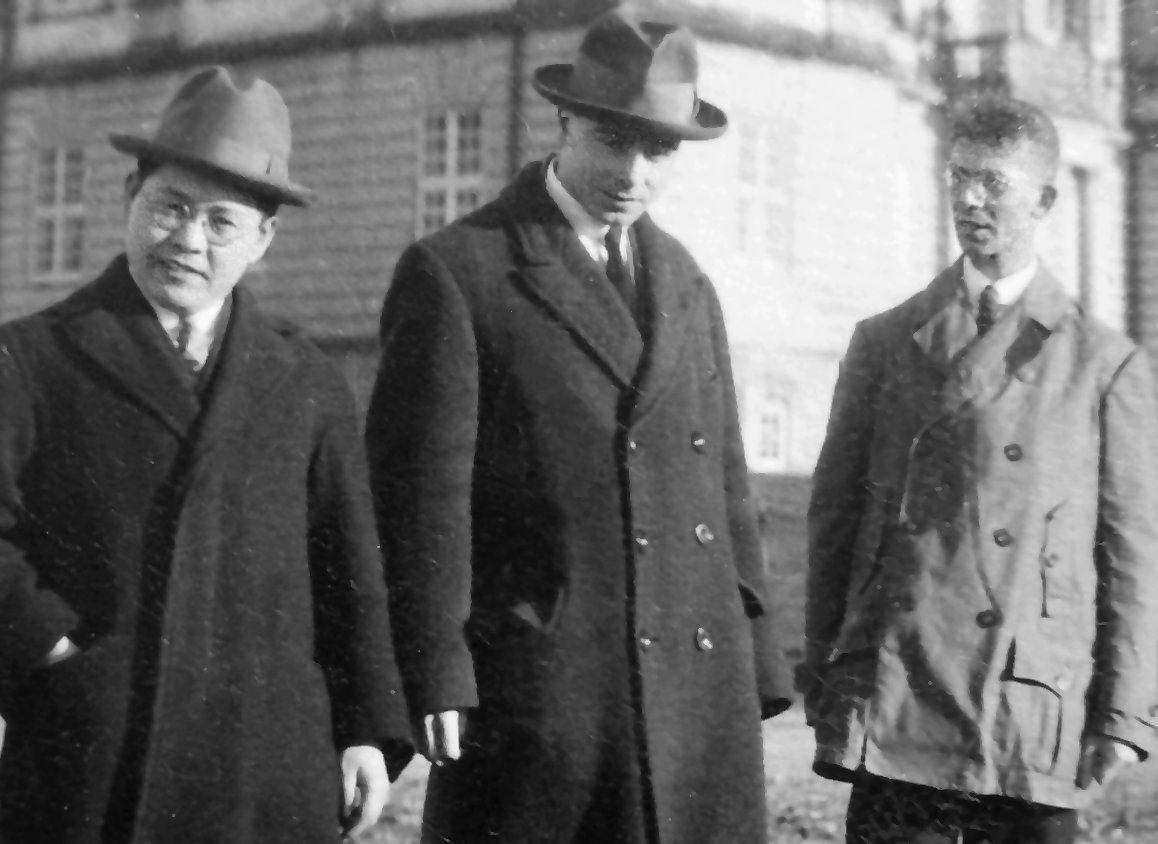
Yoshio Nishina, Thomas, and Friedrich Hund in Copenhagen in 1926

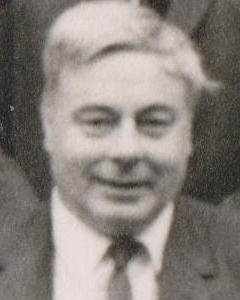
Thomas in Copenhagen in 1963

== See also ==
- Thomas–Fermi approximation
