= Thomas–Fermi model =

Primitive quantum mechanical model of electronic structure

The Thomas–Fermi (TF) model, named after Llewellyn Thomas and Enrico Fermi, is a quantum mechanical theory for the electronic structure of many-body systems developed semiclassically shortly after the introduction of the Schrödinger equation. It stands separate from wave function theory as being formulated in terms of the electronic density alone and as such is viewed as a precursor to modern density functional theory. The Thomas–Fermi model is correct only in the limit of an infinite nuclear charge. Using the approximation for realistic systems yields poor quantitative predictions, even failing to reproduce some general features of the density such as shell structure in atoms and Friedel oscillations in solids. It has, however, found modern applications in many fields through the ability to extract qualitative trends analytically and with the ease at which the model can be solved. The kinetic energy expression of Thomas–Fermi theory is also used as a component in more sophisticated density approximation to the kinetic energy within modern orbital-free density functional theory.

Working independently, Thomas and Fermi used this model in 1927 to approximate the distribution of electrons in an atom. Although electrons are distributed nonuniformly in an atom, the approximation was made that in each small volume element ΔV (i.e. locally), the electrons are distributed uniformly. The electron density $n(\mathbf{r})$ can still vary from one volume element to the next.

== Kinetic energy ==
For a small volume element ΔV, and for the atom in its ground state, we can fill out a spherical momentum-space volume V_{F} up to the Fermi momentum p_{F}, and thus
$$V_\text{F} = \frac{4}{3} \pi p_\text{F}^3(\mathbf{r}),$$
where $\mathbf{r}$ is the position vector of a point in ΔV.

The corresponding phase-space volume is
$$\Delta V_\text{ph} = V_\text{F} \,\Delta V = \frac{4}{3} \pi p_\text{F}^3(\mathbf{r}) \,\Delta V.$$

In the phase-space volume ΔV_{ph}, the electrons are distributed uniformly with density 2/h^{3} where h is the Planck constant. The number of electrons in ΔV_{ph} is
$$\Delta N_\text{ph} = \frac{2}{h^3} \,\Delta V_\text{ph} = \frac{8\pi}{3h^3} p_\text{F}^3(\mathbf{r}) \,\Delta V.$$

The electron number density in real space is this number per volume ΔV, and hence
$$n(\mathbf{r}) = \frac{\Delta N_\text{ph}}{\Delta V}
=
\frac{8\pi}{3h^3} p_\text{F}^3(\mathbf{r}).$$
The fraction of electrons at $\mathbf{r}$ that have momentum between p and p + dp is
$$F_\mathbf{r}(p) \,dp = \begin{cases}
\dfrac{4 \pi p^2 \,dp}{\frac{4}{3} \pi p_\text{F}^3(\mathbf{r})} & \text{if}\ p \le p_\text{F}(\mathbf{r}), \\[1ex]
0 & \text{otherwise}.
\end{cases}$$

Using the classical expression for the kinetic energy of an electron with mass m_{e}, the kinetic energy per unit volume at $\mathbf{r}$ for the electrons of the atom is
$$\begin{align}
t(\mathbf{r}) &= \int \frac{p^2}{2m_\text{e}} n(\mathbf{r}) F_\mathbf{r}(p) \,dp \\
&= n(\mathbf{r}) \int_0^{p_\text{F}(\mathbf{r})} \frac{p^2}{2m_\text{e}} \frac{4 \pi p^2}{\frac{4}{3} \pi p_\text{F}^3(\mathbf{r})} \,dp \\
&= C_\text{kin} [n(\mathbf{r})]^{5/3},
\end{align}$$
In the last step, the previous expression relating $n(\mathbf{r})$ to $p_\text{F}(\mathbf{r})$ has been used, and
$$C_\text{kin} = \frac{3h^2}{40m_\text{e}} \left(\frac{3}{\pi}\right)^{\frac{2}{3}}.$$

Integrating the kinetic energy per unit volume $t(\mathbf{r})$ over all space results in the total kinetic energy of the electrons:
$$T = C_\text{kin} \int [n(\mathbf{r})]^{5/3} \,d^3r.$$

This result shows that the total kinetic energy of the electrons can be expressed in terms of only the spatially varying electron density $n(\mathbf{r}),$ according to the Thomas–Fermi model. As such, they were able to calculate the energy of an atom using this expression for the kinetic energy combined with the classical expressions for the nuclear–electron and electron–electron Coulomb interactions (which can both also be represented in terms of the electron density).

== Potential energies ==
The potential energy of an atom's electrons, due to the electric attraction of the positively charged nucleus is
$$U_\text{eN} = \int n(\mathbf{r}) V_\text{N}(\mathbf{r}) \,d^3r,$$
where $V_\text{N}(\mathbf{r})$ is the potential energy of an electron at $\mathbf{r}$ that is due to the electric field of the nucleus. For the case of a nucleus centered at $\mathbf{r} = 0$ with charge Ze, where Z is a positive integer, and e is the elementary charge,
$$V_\text{N}(\mathbf{r}) = \frac{-Ze^2}{r}.$$

The potential energy of the electrons due to their mutual electric repulsion is
$$U_\text{ee} = \frac{1}{2} e^2 \int \frac{n(\mathbf{r}) n(\mathbf{r}')}{|\mathbf{r} - \mathbf{r}'|} \,d^3r \,d^3r'.$$

This is the Hartree approximation to the electron-electron interaction. A more refined calculation would take into account the antisymmetry of the many-body wave function and leads to the so-called exchange interaction.

== Total energy ==
The total energy of the electrons is the sum of their kinetic and potential energies:
$$\begin{align}
E &= T + U_\text{eN} + U_\text{ee} \\
&= C_\text{kin} \int [n(\mathbf{r})]^{5/3} \,d^3r
+ \int n(\mathbf{r}) V_\text{N}(\mathbf{r}) \,d^3r
+ \frac{1}{2} e^2 \int \frac{n(\mathbf{r}) n(\mathbf{r}')}{|\mathbf{r} - \mathbf{r}'|} \,d^3r \,d^3r'.
\end{align}$$

== Thomas–Fermi equation ==
In order to minimize the energy E while keeping the number of electrons constant, we add a Lagrange multiplier term of the form
$$-\mu\left(-N + \int n(\mathbf{r}) \,d^3r\right)$$
to E. Letting the variation with respect to n vanish then gives the equation
$$\mu = \frac{5}{3} C_\text{kin} n(\mathbf{r})^{2/3} + V_\text{N}(\mathbf{r}) + e^2 \int \frac{n(\mathbf{r}')}{|\mathbf{r} - \mathbf{r}'|} \,d^3r',$$
which must hold wherever $n(\mathbf{r})$ is nonzero. If we define the total potential $V(\mathbf{r})$ by
$$V(\mathbf{r}) = V_\text{N}(\mathbf{r}) + e^2 \int \frac{n(\mathbf{r}')}{|\mathbf{r} - \mathbf{r}'|} \,d^3r',$$
then
$$n(\mathbf{r}) = \begin{cases}
\left(\frac{5}{3} C_\text{kin}\right)^{-3/2} (\mu - V(\mathbf{r}))^{3/2} & \text{if}\ \mu \ge V(\mathbf{r}), \\[1ex]
0 & \text{otherwise.}
\end{cases}$$
If the nucleus is assumed to be a point with charge Ze at the origin, then $n(\mathbf{r})$ and $V(\mathbf{r})$ will both be functions only of the radius $r = |\mathbf{r}|,$ and we can define φ(r) by
$$\mu - V(r) = \frac{Ze^2}{r} \phi\left(\frac{r}{b}\right), \qquad
b = \frac{1}{4} \left(\frac{9 \pi^2}{2Z}\right)^{1/3} a_0,$$
where a_{0} is the Bohr radius. From using the above equations together with Gauss's law, φ(r) can be seen to satisfy the Thomas–Fermi equation
$$\frac{d^2\phi}{dr^2} = \frac{\phi^{3/2}}{\sqrt{r}}, \qquad \phi(0) = 1.$$

For chemical potential μ = 0, this is a model of a neutral atom, with an infinite charge cloud where $n(\mathbf{r})$ is everywhere nonzero and the overall charge is zero, while for μ < 0, it is a model of a positive ion, with a finite charge cloud and positive overall charge. The edge of the cloud is where φ(r) = 0. For μ > 0, it can be interpreted as a model of a compressed atom, so that negative charge is squeezed into a smaller space. In this case the atom ends at the radius r where dφ/dr = φ/r.

== Inaccuracies and improvements ==
Although this was an important first step, the Thomas–Fermi equation is limited in accuracy because the method does not attempt to represent the exchange energy of an atom as a consequence of the Pauli exclusion principle (electrons with parallel spin cannot appear at the same place, reducing their Coulomb repulsion). A term for the exchange energy was added by Dirac in 1930, which significantly improved its accuracy. Wigner computed in 1934 an approximate form of the so-called correlation energy which captures the interaction among electrons with opposite spins.

However, the Thomas–Fermi–Dirac theory remained rather inaccurate for most applications. The largest source of error was in the representation of the kinetic energy, followed by the errors in the exchange energy, and due to the complete neglect of electron correlation.

In 1962, Edward Teller showed that Thomas–Fermi theory cannot describe molecular bonding – the energy of any molecule calculated with TF theory is higher than the sum of the energies of the constituent atoms. More generally, the total energy of a molecule decreases when the bond lengths are uniformly increased. This can be overcome by improving the expression for the kinetic energy.

One notable historical improvement to the Thomas–Fermi kinetic energy is the Weizsäcker (1935) correction,
$$T_\text{W} = \frac{1}{8} \frac{\hbar^2}{m} \int\frac{|\nabla n(\mathbf{r})|^2}{n(\mathbf{r})} \,d^3r,$$
which is the other building block of orbital-free density functional theory. The problem with the inaccurate modelling of the kinetic energy in the Thomas–Fermi model, as well as other orbital-free density functionals, is circumvented in Kohn–Sham density functional theory with a fictitious system of non-interacting electrons whose kinetic energy expression is known.

== See also ==
- Thomas–Fermi screening
- Gas in a box § Thomas–Fermi approximation for the degeneracy of states
