= Thomas–Fermi equation =

Numerical solutions of the Thomas–Fermi equation

In mathematics, the Thomas–Fermi equation for the neutral atom is a second order non-linear ordinary differential equation, named after Llewellyn Thomas and Enrico Fermi, which can be derived by applying the Thomas–Fermi model to atoms. The equation reads

$$\frac{d^2y}{dx^2} = \frac{1}{\sqrt x} y^{3/2}$$

subject to the boundary conditions

$$y(0)=1, \quad  \quad \begin{cases}y(\infty)=0 \quad \text{for neutral atoms}\\
y(x_0)=0 \quad \text{for positive ions}\\
y(x_1)-x_1y'(x_1)=0\quad \text{for compressed neutral atoms}\end{cases}$$

If $y$ approaches zero as $x$ becomes large, this equation models the charge distribution of a neutral atom as a function of radius $x$. Solutions where $y$ becomes zero at finite $x$ model positive ions. For solutions where $y$ becomes large and positive as $x$ becomes large, it can be interpreted as a model of a compressed atom, where the charge is squeezed into a smaller space. In this case the atom ends at the value of $x$ for which $dy/dx=y/x$.

== Transformations ==
Introducing the transformation $z=y/x$ converts the equation to

$$\frac{1}{x^2}\frac{d}{dx}\left(x^2\frac{dz}{dx}\right) - z^{3/2}=0$$

This equation is similar to Lane–Emden equation with polytropic index $3/2$ except the sign difference. The original equation is invariant under the transformation $x\rightarrow c x, \ y\rightarrow c^{-3} y$. Hence, the equation can be made equidimensional by introducing $y=x^{-3} u$ into the equation, leading to

$$x^2 \frac{d^2u}{dx^2} - 6x\frac{du}{dx} + 12 u = u^{3/2}$$

so that the substitution $x=e^t$ reduces the equation to

$$\frac{d^2u}{dt^2} - 7\frac{du}{dt} +12 u = u^{3/2}.$$

Treating $w =du/dt$ as the dependent variable and $u$ as the independent variable, we can reduce the above equation to

$$w \frac{dw}{du} - 7w = u^{3/2}-12 u.$$

But this first order equation has no known explicit solution, hence, the approach turns to either numerical or approximate methods.

== Sommerfeld's approximation ==
The equation has a particular solution $y_p(x)$, which satisfies the boundary condition that $y\rightarrow 0$ as $x\rightarrow\infty$, but not the boundary condition y(0)=1. This particular solution is

$$y_p(x) = \frac{144}{x^3}.$$

Arnold Sommerfeld used this particular solution and provided an approximate solution which can satisfy the other boundary condition in 1932. If the transformation $x=1/t, \ w = yt$ is introduced, the equation becomes

$$t^4\frac{d^2w}{dt^2} = w^{3/2}, \quad w(0)=0, \ w(\infty)\sim t.$$

The particular solution in the transformed variable is then $w_p(t)= 144 t^4$. So one assumes a solution of the form $w=w_p(1+\alpha t^\lambda)$ and if this is substituted in the above equation and the coefficients of $\alpha$ are equated, one obtains the value for $\lambda$, which is given by the roots of the equation $\lambda^2 + 7\lambda -6=0$. The two roots are $\lambda_1 = 0.772, \ \lambda_2 = -7.772$, where we need to take the positive root to avoid the singularity at the origin. This solution already satisfies the first boundary condition ($w(0)=0$), so, to satisfy the second boundary condition, one writes to the same level of accuracy for an arbitrary $n$

$$W=w_p(1+\beta t^\lambda)^n = [144 t^3(1+\beta t^\lambda)^n]t.$$

The second boundary condition will be satisfied if $144t^3(1+\beta t^\lambda)^n = 144 t^3 \beta^n t^{\lambda n}(1+\beta^{-1}t^{-\lambda})^n\sim 1$ as $t\rightarrow\infty$. This condition is satisfied if $\lambda n + 3 =0, \ 144 \beta^n =1$ and since $\lambda_1\lambda_2=-6$, Sommerfeld found the approximation as $\lambda = \lambda_1, \ n =-3/\lambda_1 = \lambda_2/2$. Therefore, the approximate solution is

$$y(x) = y_p(x) \{1+[y_p(x)]^{\lambda_1/3}\}^{\lambda_2/2}.$$

This solution predicts the correct solution accurately for large $x$, but still fails near the origin.

== Solution near origin ==
Enrico Fermi provided the solution for $x\ll 1$ and later extended by Edward B. Baker. Hence for $x\ll 1$,

$$\begin{align}
y(x) = {} & 1 - Bx + \frac{1}{3} x^3 - \frac {2B} {15} x^4 + \cdots {} \\[6pt]
& \cdots + x^{3/2} \left[\frac 4 3 - \frac{2B} 5 x + \frac{3B^2}{70} x^2 + \left(\frac{2}{27} + \frac{B^3}{252}\right) x^3 + \cdots\right]
\end{align}$$

where $B\approx 1.588071$.

It has been reported by Salvatore Esposito that the Italian physicist Ettore Majorana found in 1928 a semi-analytical series solution to the Thomas–Fermi equation for the neutral atom, which however remained unpublished until 2001. Using this approach it is possible to compute the constant B mentioned above to practically arbitrarily high accuracy.
