= Jellium =

Physical model of solid metals as electron gases

Jellium, also known as the uniform electron gas (UEG) or homogeneous electron gas (HEG), is a quantum mechanical model of interacting free electrons in a solid where the complementary positive charges are not atomic nuclei but instead an idealized background of uniform positive charge density. This model allows one to focus on the effects in solids that occur due to the quantum nature of electrons and their mutual repulsive interactions (due to like charge) without explicit introduction of the atomic lattice and structure making up a real material. Jellium is often used in solid-state physics as a simple model of delocalized electrons in a metal, where it can qualitatively reproduce features of real metals such as screening, plasmons, Wigner crystallization and Friedel oscillations.

At zero temperature, the properties of jellium depend solely upon the constant electronic density. This property lends it to a treatment within density functional theory; the formalism itself provides the basis for the local-density approximation to the exchange-correlation energy density functional.

The term jellium was coined by Conyers Herring in 1952, alluding to the "positive jelly" background, and the typical metallic behavior it displays.

== Hamiltonian ==
The jellium model treats the electron-electron coupling rigorously. The artificial and structureless background charge interacts electrostatically with itself and the electrons. The jellium Hamiltonian for N electrons confined within a volume of space Ω, and with electronic density ρ(r) and (constant) background charge density n(R) = N/Ω is

$$\hat{H}=\hat{H}_{\mathrm{el}}+\hat{H}_{\mathrm{back}}+\hat{H}_{\mathrm{el-back}},$$

where

- H_{el} is the electronic Hamiltonian consisting of the kinetic and electron-electron repulsion terms:
  $$\hat{H}_{\mathrm{el}}=\sum_{i=1}^N\frac{p_{i}^2}{2m}+\sum_{i<j}^N\frac{e^2}{|\mathbf{r}_i-\mathbf{r}_j|}$$
- H_{back} is the Hamiltonian of the positive background charge interacting electrostatically with itself:
  $$\hat{H}_{\mathrm{back}}=\frac{e^2}{2}\int_{\Omega}\mathrm{d}\mathbf{R}\int_{\Omega}\mathrm{d}\mathbf{R}'\ \frac{n(\mathbf{R})n(\mathbf{R}')}{|\mathbf{R}-\mathbf{R}'|} = \frac{e^{2}}{2}\left(\frac{N}{\Omega}\right)^{2}\int_{\Omega}\mathrm{d}\mathbf{R}\int_{\Omega}\mathrm{d}\mathbf{R}'\ \frac{1}{|\mathbf{R}-\mathbf{R}'|}$$
- H_{el-back} is the electron-background interaction Hamiltonian, again an electrostatic interaction:
  $$\hat{H}_{\mathrm{el-back}}=\int_{\Omega}\mathrm{d}\mathbf{r}\int_{\Omega}\mathrm{d}\mathbf{R}\ \frac{\rho(\mathbf{r})n(\mathbf{R})}{|\mathbf{r}-\mathbf{R}|} = -e^{2}\frac{N}{\Omega}\sum_{i=1}^{N}\int_{\Omega}\mathrm{d}\mathbf{R}\ \frac{1}{|\mathbf{r}_{i}-\mathbf{R}|}$$

H_{back} is a constant and, in the limit of an infinite volume, divergent along with H_{el-back}. The divergence is canceled by a term from the electron-electron coupling: the background interactions cancel and the system is dominated by the kinetic energy and coupling of the electrons. Such analysis is done in Fourier space; the interaction terms of the Hamiltonian which remain correspond to the Fourier expansion of the electron coupling for which q ≠ 0.

== Contributions to the total energy ==
The traditional way to study the electron gas is to start with non-interacting electrons which are governed only by the kinetic energy part of the Hamiltonian, also called a Fermi gas. The kinetic energy per electron is given by

$$K = \frac{3}{5} E_{\rm F} = \frac{3}{5}\frac{\hbar ^2k_{\rm F}^2}{2m_{\rm e}} = \frac{3}{5}\biggl(\frac{9\pi}{4}\biggr)^{\frac{2}{3}} \frac{1}{(r'_{\rm s} / a_0)^2} \textrm{Ry} \approx \frac{2.21}{(r'_{\rm s} / a_0)^2} \textrm{Ry}$$

where $E_{\rm F}$ is the Fermi energy, $k_{\rm F}$ is the Fermi wave vector, and the last expression shows the dependence on the Wigner–Seitz radius $r'_{\rm s}$ where energy is measured in rydbergs. $a_0$ is the Bohr radius. In what follows $r_{\rm s}$ is the normalized value $r_{\rm s} = r'_{\rm s}/a_0$

Without doing much work, one can guess that the electron-electron interactions will scale like the inverse of the average electron-electron separation and hence as $1/r_{12}$ (since the Coulomb interaction goes like one over distance between charges) so that if we view the interactions as a small correction to the kinetic energy, we are describing the limit of small $r_{\rm s}$ (i.e. $1/r_{\rm s}^2$ being larger than $1/r_{\rm s}$) and hence high electron density. Unfortunately, real metals typically have $r_{\rm s}$ between 2-5 which means this picture needs serious revision.

The first correction to the free electron model for jellium is from the Fock exchange contribution to electron-electron interactions. Adding this in, one has a total energy of

$$E = \frac{2.21}{r_{\rm s}^2} - \frac{0.916}{r_{\rm s}}$$

where the negative term is due to exchange: exchange interactions lower the total energy. Higher order corrections to the total energy are due to electron correlation and if one decides to work in a series for small $r_s$, one finds

$$E = \frac{2.21}{r_{\rm s}^2} - \frac{0.916}{r_{\rm s}}  + 0.0622 \ln (r_{\rm s}) - 0.096 + O(r_{\rm s})$$

The series is quite accurate for small $r_{\rm s}$ but of dubious value for $r_{\rm s}$ values found in actual metals.

For the full range of $r_{\rm s}$, Chachiyo's correlation energy density can be used as the higher order correction. In this case,

$$E = \frac{2.21}{r_{\rm s}^2} - \frac{0.916}{r_{\rm s}}  +  a \ln \left( 1  + \frac{b}{r_{\rm s}} + \frac{b}{r_{\rm s}^2} \right)$$

where $a = (\ln 2 - 1)/2\pi^2 \approx -0.01556$ and $b = 20.4652557$ come from an exact small-$r_{\rm s}$ expansion of the correlation, which agrees quite well (on the order of milli-Hartree) with the quantum Monte Carlo simulation.

== Zero-temperature phase diagram of jellium in three and two dimensions ==
The physics of the zero-temperature phase behavior of jellium is driven by competition between the kinetic energy of the electrons and the electron-electron interaction energy. The kinetic-energy operator in the Hamiltonian scales as $1/r_{\rm s}^2$, where $r_{\rm s}$ is the Wigner–Seitz radius, whereas the interaction energy operator scales as $1/r_{\rm s}$. Hence the kinetic energy dominates at high density (small $r_{\rm s}$), while the interaction energy dominates at low density (large $r_{\rm s}$).

The limit of high density is where jellium most resembles a noninteracting free electron gas. To minimize the kinetic energy, the single-electron states are delocalized, in a state very close to the Slater determinant (non-interacting state) constructed from plane waves. Here the lowest-momentum plane-wave states are doubly occupied by spin-up and spin-down electrons, giving a paramagnetic Fermi fluid.

At lower densities, where the interaction energy is more important, it is energetically advantageous for the electron gas to spin-polarize (i.e., to have an imbalance in the number of spin-up and spin-down electrons), resulting in a ferromagnetic Fermi fluid. This phenomenon is known as itinerant ferromagnetism. At sufficiently low density, the kinetic-energy penalty resulting from the need to occupy higher-momentum plane-wave states is more than offset by the reduction in the interaction energy due to the fact that exchange effects keep indistinguishable electrons away from one another.

A further reduction in the interaction energy (at the expense of kinetic energy) can be achieved by localizing the electron orbitals. As a result, jellium at zero temperature at a sufficiently low density will form a so-called Wigner crystal, in which the single-particle orbitals are of approximately Gaussian form centered on crystal lattice sites. Once a Wigner crystal has formed, there may in principle be further phase transitions between different crystal structures and between different magnetic states for the Wigner crystals (e.g., antiferromagnetic to ferromagnetic spin configurations) as the density is lowered. When Wigner crystallization occurs, jellium acquires a band gap.

Within Hartree–Fock theory, the ferromagnetic fluid abruptly becomes more stable than the paramagnetic fluid at a density parameter of $r_{\rm s}=5.45$ in three dimensions (3D) and $2.01$ in two dimensions (2D). However, according to Hartree–Fock theory, Wigner crystallization occurs at $r_{\rm s}=4.5$ in 3D and $1.44$ in 2D, so that jellium would crystallise before itinerant ferromagnetism occurs. Furthermore, Hartree–Fock theory predicts exotic magnetic behavior, with the paramagnetic fluid being unstable to the formation of a spiral spin-density wave. Unfortunately, Hartree–Fock theory does not include any description of correlation effects, which are energetically important at all but the very highest densities, and so a more accurate level of theory is required to make quantitative statements about the phase diagram of jellium.

Quantum Monte Carlo (QMC) methods, which provide an explicit treatment of electron correlation effects, are generally agreed to provide the most accurate quantitative approach for determining the zero-temperature phase diagram of jellium. The first application of the diffusion Monte Carlo method was Ceperley and Alder's famous 1980 calculation of the zero-temperature phase diagram of 3D jellium. They calculated the paramagnetic-ferromagnetic fluid transition to occur at $r_s=75(5)$ and Wigner crystallization (to a body-centered cubic crystal) to occur at $r_{\rm s}=100(20)$. Subsequent QMC calculations have refined their phase diagram: there is a second-order transition from a paramagnetic fluid state to a partially spin-polarized fluid from $r_{\rm s}=50(2)$ to about $100$; and Wigner crystallization occurs at $r_{\rm s}=106(1)$.

In 2D, QMC calculations indicate that the paramagnetic fluid to ferromagnetic fluid transition and Wigner crystallization occur at similar density parameters, in the range $30<r_{\rm s}<40$. The most recent QMC calculations indicate that there is no region of stability for a ferromagnetic fluid. Instead there is a transition from a paramagnetic fluid to a hexagonal Wigner crystal at $r_{\rm s}=31(1)$. There is possibly a small region of stability for a (frustrated) antiferromagnetic Wigner crystal, before a further transition to a ferromagnetic crystal. The crystallization transition in 2D is not first order, so there must be a continuous series of transitions from fluid to crystal, perhaps involving striped crystal/fluid phases. Experimental results for a 2D hole gas in a GaAs/AlGaAs heterostructure (which, despite being clean, may not correspond exactly to the idealized jellium model) indicate a Wigner crystallization density of $r_{\rm s}=35.1(9)$.

== Applications ==
Jellium is the simplest model of interacting electrons. It is employed in the calculation of properties of metals, where the core electrons and the nuclei are modeled as the uniform positive background and the valence electrons are treated with full rigor. Semi-infinite jellium slabs are used to investigate surface properties such as work function and surface effects such as adsorption; near surfaces the electronic density varies in an oscillatory manner, decaying to a constant value in the bulk.

Within density functional theory, jellium is used in the construction of the local-density approximation, which in turn is a component of more sophisticated exchange-correlation energy functionals. From quantum Monte Carlo calculations of jellium, accurate values of the correlation energy density have been obtained for several values of the electronic density, which have been used to construct semi-empirical correlation functionals.

The jellium model has been applied to superatoms, metal clusters, octacarbonyl complexes, and used in nuclear physics.

== See also ==
- Free electron model — a model electron gas where the electrons do not interact with anything.
- Nearly free electron model — a model electron gas where the electrons do not interact with each other, but do feel a (weak) potential from the atomic lattice.
