= Self-consistency =

Self-consistency may refer to:

- Novikov self-consistency principle, a conjecture concerning time travel
- Self-consistent field method, an approximation method in quantum mechanics
- Self-constancy, a concept in developmental psychology

== See also ==
- Consistency (disambiguation)
