= Functional (mathematics) =

Map from a vector space to its underlying field

The arc length functional has as its domain the vector space of rectifiable curves – a subspace of C([0,1], ℝ ^{3})– and outputs a real scalar. This is an example of a non-linear functional.

The Riemann integral is a linear functional on the vector space of functions defined on [a, b] that are Riemann-integrable from a to b.

In functional analysis, a functional is a map from a vector space to its underlying field. (Note: "A real function on a space R is a mapping of R into the space ℝ^{1} (the real line). Thus, for example, a mapping of ℝ^{n} into ℝ^{1} is an ordinary real-valued function of n variables. In the case when the space R itself consists of functions, the functions of the elements of R are usually called functionals.") Elements of this field are called scalars, typically real or complex numbers. If the map is linear, the functional is called a linear functional. (Note: "A numerical function f(x) defined on a normed linear space R will be called a functional. A functional f(x) is said to be linear if f(α x + β y) =α f(x) + β f(y) where x,y ∈ R and α, β are ordinary numbers.") In some cases, a linear form or linear functional is defined using a free module over a commutative ring. (Note: "Let E be a free module over a commutative ring A. We view A as a free module of rank 1 over itself. By the dual module E^{v} of E we shall mean the module Hom(E, A). Its elements will be called functionals. Thus a functional on E^{v} is an A-linear map f: E → A.")

The definite integral is a linear functional on the space of continuous real-valued functions over the interval [a, b], as it linearly maps each function to a real number. In contrast, the norm of a vector on a normed space is a nonlinear functional.

Beginning in the 17th century, mathematicians developed functionals to solve variational problems: finding the function representing a curve, surface, or path that minimizes or maximizes a specific measurement. This process requires assigning a single scalar to each possible function. Vito Volterra's functions of lines (fonctions de lignes) assigned a scalar to the function representing a curve. Inspired by Volterra's work, Jacques Hadamard introduced the modern term "functional" (fonctionnelle) in 1903 to describe linear mappings on the space of continuous functions.

Functionals play a central role in the calculus of variations, mathematical optimization, distribution theory, mathematical physics, and machine learning. An important application in physics involves Lagrangian mechanics and the principle of stationary action.

== Properties ==
=== Dual space ===
The set of all linear functionals on a vector space V forms its algebraic dual vector space, denoted by V^{*}. The set of all linear functionals on the algebraic dual space forms the second algebraic dual vector space, denoted as V^{**}.

If x is a vector x ∈ V, and y is the linear functional y ∈ V^{*} then applying the functional to the vector generates a scalar, denoted by y(x) or [x,y]. Similarly, applying the linear functional z ∈ V^{**} to the vector y ∈ V^{*} generates the scalar [y,z]. For any fixed vector x_{0} ∈ V, there is a corresponding unique functional z_{0} ∈ V^{**} such that for all y ∈ V^{*} this equation holds:
$$[x_{0},y]=[y, z_{0}].$$
This correspondence is called a natural correspondence between V and V^{**}. This correspondence defines a canonical map or canonical embedding of V into V^{**}. If V is isomorphic with a linear subspace of V^{**}, then V is embeddable in V^{**}. If the canonical map is surjective, then the canonical map is bijective and V is called algebraically reflexive. If V is finite dimensional, then V is algebraically reflexive.

=== Locality ===
If a functional's value can be computed for small segments of the input curve and then summed to find the total value, the functional is called local. Otherwise it is called non-local. For example:
$$F(y) = \int_{x_0}^{x_1}y(x)\;\mathrm{d}x$$
is local while
$$F(y) = \frac{\int_{x_0}^{x_1}y(x)\;\mathrm{d}x}{\int_{x_0}^{x_1} (1+ [y(x)]^2)\;\mathrm{d}x}$$
is non-local. This occurs commonly when integrals occur separately in the numerator and denominator of an equation such as in calculations of center of mass.

== Examples ==
=== Definite integral ===
Integrals may form a special class of functionals such as:
$$f\mapsto I[f] = \int_{\Omega} H(f(x),f'(x),\ldots) \; \mu(\mathrm{d}x).$$
They map a function $f$ into a real number, provided that $H$ is real-valued. Examples include

- the area underneath the graph of a positive function $f$

$$f\mapsto\int_{x_0}^{x_1}f(x)\;\mathrm{d}x$$

- $L^p$ norm of a function on a set $E$

$$f\mapsto \left(\int_E|f|^p \; \mathrm{d}x\right)^{1/p}$$

- the arclength of a curve in 2-dimensional Euclidean space

$$f \mapsto \int_{x_0}^{x_1} \sqrt{ 1+|f'(x)|^2 } \; \mathrm{d}x$$

=== Inner product spaces ===
Given an inner product space $X,$ and a fixed vector $\vec{x} \in X,$ the map defined by $\vec{y} \mapsto \vec{x} \cdot \vec{y}$ is a linear functional on $X.$ The set of vectors $\vec{y}$ such that $\vec{x}\cdot \vec{y}$ is zero is a vector subspace of $X,$ called the null space or kernel of the functional, or the orthogonal complement of $\vec{x},$ denoted $\{\vec{x}\}^\perp.$

For example, taking the inner product with a fixed function $g \in L^2([-\pi,\pi])$ defines a (linear) functional on the Hilbert space $L^2([-\pi,\pi])$ of square integrable functions on $[-\pi,\pi]:$
$$f \mapsto \langle f,g \rangle = \int_{[-\pi,\pi]} \bar{f} g$$

== Functional equations ==
An equation containing functionals is called a functional equation. The solution to a functional equation is one or more functions. This is Cauchy's functional equation:
$$f(x + y) = f(x) + f(y) \qquad \text{ for all } x, y.$$

== Derivative and integration ==
Lagrangian mechanics uses functional derivatives to determine how a functional changes when its input function changes slightly. Richard Feynman's sum-over-histories approach to quantum mechanics uses functional integrals evaluated over a function space.

== Bibliography ==
- Axler, Sheldon (2015), Linear Algebra Done Right, Undergraduate Texts in Mathematics (3rd ed.), Springer, ISBN 978-3-319-11079-0
- Cartwright, Mary L. (1965). "Jacques Hadamard. 1865-1963". Biographical Memoirs of Fellows of the Royal Society. 11 (11). The Royal Society: 75–99. doi:10.1098/rsbm.1965.0005. ISSN 0080-4606. JSTOR 769262.
- Chabert, Jean-Luc; Gilain, Christian (2024). "« Sans amour et sans haine » : la Grande Guerre de Jacques Hadamard". Cahiers François Viète (in French) (III-16). Nantes Université: 169–205. doi:10.4000/11qww. ISSN 1297-9112.
- Gelfand, Izrail Moiseevich; Fomin, Sergei Vasil'evich (1963). Calculus of Variations: By I.M. Gelfand and S.V. Fomin. Rev. English Ed. Translated and Edited by Richard A. Silverman.
- Edwards, R. E. (1965). Functional Analysis: Theory and Applications. Courier Corporation. ISBN 978-0-486-14510-5.
- Goldstein, Herbert; Poole, Charles P.; Safko, John L. (2008). Classical mechanics (3rd ed., [Nachdr.] ed.). San Francisco, Munich: Addison Wesley. ISBN 978-0-201-65702-9.
- Goldstine, H. H. (2012). A History of the Calculus of Variations from the 17th through the 19th Century. Springer Science & Business Media. ISBN 978-1-4613-8106-8.
- Hadamard, Jacques (1903). "Sur les opérations fonctionnelles". Comptes Rendus de l'Académie des Sciences (Paris). 136: 351–354.
- Halmos, P. R. (2012). Finite-Dimensional Vector Spaces. Springer Science & Business Media. ISBN 978-1-4612-6387-6.
- Hoffman, Kenneth; Kunze, Ray Alden (1971). Linear Algebra, by Kenneth Hoffman and Ray Kunze.
- Klauder, John R. (2010). A Modern Approach to Functional Integration. Springer Science & Business Media. ISBN 978-0-8176-4790-2.
- Kolmogorov, Andrej N.; Fomin, Sergej V. (1967). Elements of the theory of functions and functional analysis. 1. Metric and normed spaces. Graylock Press.
- Kreyszig, Erwin (1978). Introductory Functional Analysis with Applications. John Wiley & Sons. ISBN 978-0-471-50459-7.
- Kuczma, Marek (2009). An introduction to the theory of functional equations and inequalities. Cauchy's equation and Jensen's inequality. Basel: Birkhäuser. ISBN 9783764387495.
- Lang, Serge (2005). Algebra. Springer Science & Business Media. ISBN 978-0-387-95385-4.
- Luenberger, David G. (January 15, 1969). Optimization by Vector Space Methods. Wiley. ISBN 978-0-471-55359-5.
- Simovici, Dan (2018). Mathematical Analysis for Machine Learning and Data Mining. World Scientific. ISBN 978-981-322-970-9.
- Wilansky, Albert (2013). Modern Methods in Topological Vector Spaces. Courier Corporation. ISBN 978-0-486-49353-4.
- Wilansky, Albert (2013a). Topology for Analysis. Courier Corporation. ISBN 978-0-486-15075-8.

== See also ==
- Linear form – Linear map from a vector space to its field of scalars
- Optimization (mathematics) – Study of mathematical algorithms for optimization problems
- Tensor – Algebraic object with geometric applications
