= Stefano Fantoni =

Italian physicist

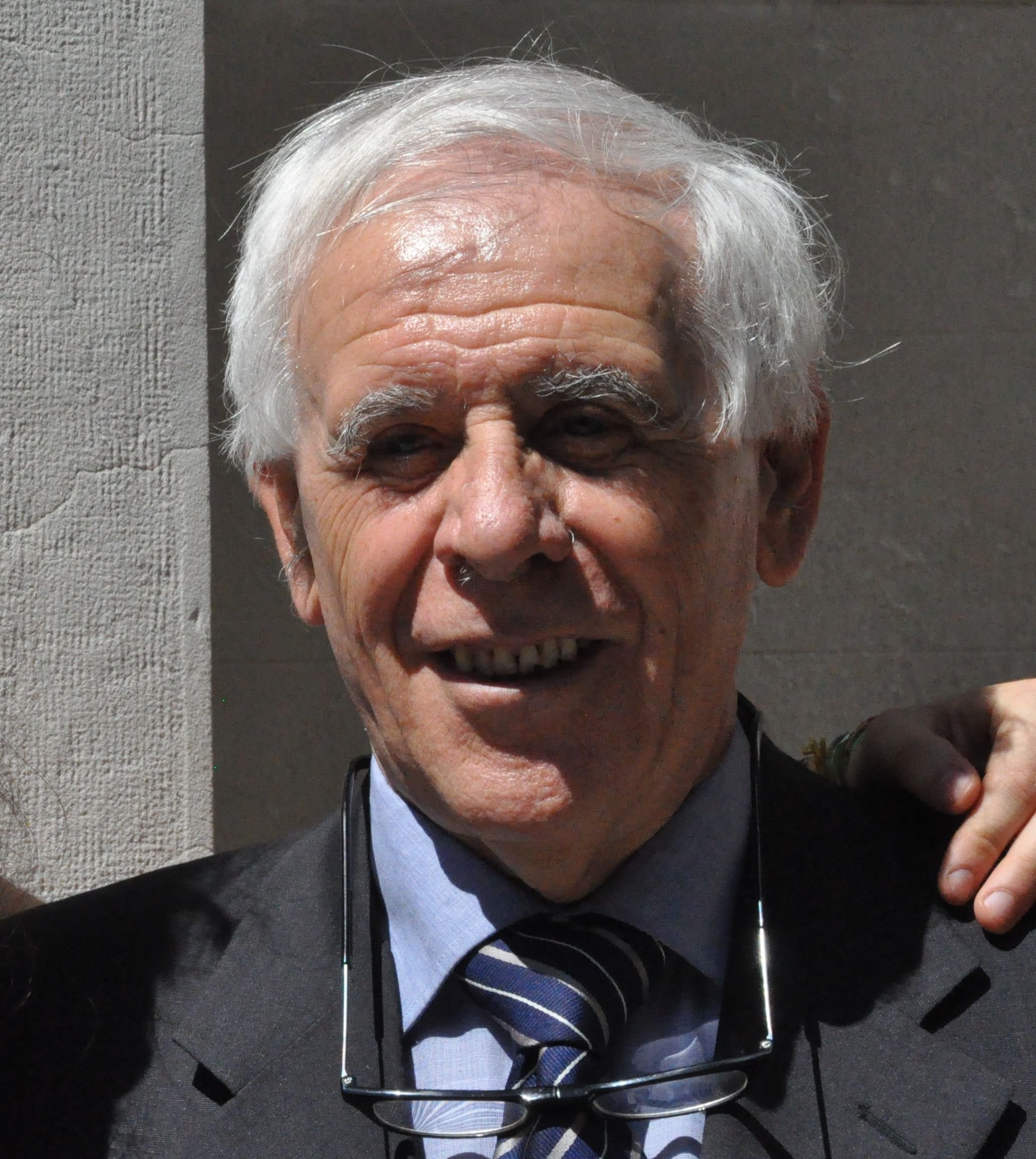
- Stefano Fantoni in 2019
- Born: 4 June 1945 (age 81); Taranto, Italy
- Known for: Fantoni-Rosati (FR) cluster expansion Hyper Netted Chain (FHNC) integral equations Correlated Basis Function (CBF) theory Auxiliary Field Diffusion Monte Carlo (AFDMC) method
- Spouse: Daniela Belli (m. 1969)
- Awards: Kalinga Prize (2001); Premio Piazzano; Pirelli Internetional Award; Premio Capo d’Orlando; Eugene Feenberg Memorial Medal

Academic background
- Education: University of Pisa (graduation 1968); Scuola Normale Superiore di Pisa (PhD 1970)
- Academic advisors: Luigi Arialdo Radicati di Brozolo; Sergio Rosati

Academic work
- Discipline: Physicist
- Sub-discipline: Quantum many-body physics Strongly Interacting Fermi Systems; Nuclear matter Neutron matter

Stefano Fantoni (born 4 June 1945) is an Italian theoretical physicist, now retired from the International School for Advanced Studies in Trieste (SISSA), still working in the fields of nuclear physics and low temperature physics.

He may be best known for his work done with Kevin Schmidt on Quantum Monte Carlo methods for nuclear systems, and particularly the development of the Auxiliary Field Diffusion Monte Carlo (AFDMC) method, heavily used in nuclear and neutron matter calculations.

== Early life and education ==
Stefano Fantoni was born in Taranto on 4 June 1945. He attended the high school in Livorno, graduated in physics in 1968 from University of Pisa, and received his PhD degree in 1970 from the Scuola Normale Superiore.

Stefano Fantoni married in 1969 and has two children and two grandchildren.

== Career and research activity ==
He first worked as an assistant lecturer at the University of Pisa from November 1970 and then as associate professor since 1972. In 1986 he became full professor and three-month later he was given the chair of Nuclear Physics at the University of Lecce. From 1991 to 2000 he acted as Director of the Interdisciplinary Laboratory of the International School for Advanced Studies, SISSA in Trieste. In 2004 he was elected and nominated as SISSA Director, duty that he has covered until November 2010.

=== Research ===
Fantoni's research activity has been mainly devoted to quantum liquids of interest of nuclear and condensed matter phenomena typical of low temperature physics. He started doing research during his graduation thesis in light nuclei with his first article in 1970 on ^{6}Li. He is today among the three topmost scientists of Italian nationality in the field of theoretical Nuclear physics.

The common denominator of his research was to go beyond the mean-field models in solving the so-called many-body theory that occurs in quantum Bose or/and Fermi systems, characterized by the presence of strong correlations among their components. In this context he gave four main contributions: (i) the development cluster expansion techniques, known in the literature as the Fantoni-Rosati (FR) cluster expansion, (ii) the derivation of the Fermi Hyper Netted Chain (FHNC) equations, to sum up series of cluster terms (iii) the development of Correlated Basis Function theory (CBF) and, more recently, (iv) the development of a new numerical simulation Monte Carlo method for nuclear systems, known as Auxiliary Field Diffusion Monte Carlo (AFDMC).

Fantoni founded four research groups one in Pisa, a second one in Lecce and a third one in Urbana, Illinois, all in the field of nuclear physics and a fourth one in Trieste in Condensed matter physics. He also coordinated a research group made of few Italian and foreign universities and research laboratories in the field of nuclear astrophysics.

=== Italian representative of nuclear physics ===
He has been the Italian representative of nuclear physics in several international bodies dealing with future perspectives in nuclear physics and electron scattering off nuclei at intermediate energies. His research group at the SISSA Interdisciplinary Laboratory has developed a new communication model based on the existing interconnections and inter-relations among communicating agents,. The SISSA model has been designed to overcome some of the deficiencies of the traditional top-down model in which communication simply flows from those who know to those who do not know. In connections with this kind of research Stefano Fantoni founded in 2005 the first PhD school in Science and Society supported by both SISSA and the University of Milan. Fantoni has been co-editor of the series Tessere (Cuen editing company, Naples) (1994–1998); publisher of the e-journal JCOM from its foundation in 2004 and author of various articles in newspapers and books and of a dozen research articles on science communication.

== International experience ==
Stefano Fantoni spent several stays abroad as visiting professor: in 1977 at the Niels Bohr Institute of Copenhagen in 1979 at the Institute fur Physik in Koln; from 1980 to 1982 and in 1984 at the Department of Physics, University of Illinois at Urbana–Champaign in 1990 at the Jefferson Laboratory (CEBAF) in Newport News, Virginia, r; in 2000 at the Theory Center Seattle (Washington).

He has also been a consultant of the National Science Foundation and of the European Commission in the framework of INTAS program; Italian delegate to the OECD Committee Megaforum Science in Nuclear Physics in 1997 and 1998; member of the Program Advisory Committee for the Jefferson Laboratory at Newport News in Virginia from 1989 to 1993, when the accelerator was still under construction and the center began to outline its strategic lines of experimental research; member and then chairman of the Program Advisory Committee of INFN laboratories in Legnaro (Padua) in the period 1991–1996; member of the board of directors of the European Center for Theoretical Studies in Nuclear Physics and related areas (ECT*) in 1993, when it was founded in Villazzano (Trento), until 1995; during the period 2003/2009 he was member of the International Advisory Committee of the Institute for Advanced Studies, Collegium Budapest.

== Evaluation and management experience ==
Stefano Fantoni was the founder of the Elba International Physics Center (EIPC) which he directed from 1985 to 1992. During this period EIPC acted as the Italian counterpart of the Aspen Center for Physics in Colorado, organizing conferences and workshops funded by local administration and some international research centers. In the period 1992–1993 Stefano Fantoni took part, as Italian member, together with the Danish nobelist Ben Mottelson and the French scientist Oriol Bohigas, in the Committee nominated to establish the European Centre for Theoretical Physics, ECT*. The center is still in operation in the fields of nuclear physics, astrophysics and condensed matter. From 1991 to 2000 he directed the Interdisciplinary Laboratory of SISSA, a laboratory having the mission of developing and promoting new research areas. He founded the Neuroscience sector. In 1994 he founded the School in Science Communication which he directed until 2004.

He was also president of FEST, the Trieste Festival of Scientific books and journals in the years 2007 and 2008. Stefano Fantoni has been the Director of SISSA from 2004 to 2010 and member of CRUI, the association of the Rectors of the Italian universities, in the same period. His period as director has been characterized by the design and construction of the new SISSA location, a building of almost 25000mq, 150000mq able to host the whole educational and research activity of SISSA. He has been nominated as the president of the International Foundation for the Development of Freedom of Science (FIT) in Trieste in 2008. In the same year he was nominated from the regional administration of Friuli-Venezia Giulia as delegate to the commission Coordination of universities and research institutions of the Friuli-Venezia Giulia. He has also been nominated as the president of the Trieste section of Alliance Francaise in 2009. Fantoni was a member of the national committee for the evaluation of the basic research projects (FIRB committee) from 2007 to 2010 and member of the national committee to evaluate scientific museums and projects on popularization of science from 1995 to 1997 and from 2009 to 2010. He has been the first president of ANVUR (the Italian agency for the evaluation of the university and of the research) (2011–2016). He has been the Champion of EuroScience Open Forum (ESOF), in occasion of the nomination of Trieste as European City of Science for the year 2020. He is at on the board of the EuroScience committee.

=== Director of SISSA ===
Preceded by Edoardo Boncinelli	Director of the International School for Advanced Studies; 2004–2010	Succeeded by Guido Martinelli

=== President of ANVUR ===
Preceded by –	President of ANVUR; 2011–2016	Succeeded by Paolo Miccoli

=== President of FIT ===
Preceded by Paolo Budinich	President of FIT; 2008–2011 & 2016–2026	Succeeded by Marina Cobal

=== Champion of ESOF 2020 ===
Preceded by Anne Cambon-Thomsen	Champion of ESOF; 2018–2020	Succeeded by Corinne Hofman; Ferry Breedveld

== Prizes and awards ==
For his contributions to theoretical nuclear physics and for the development of FHNC theory he has awarded the prestigious international recognition Eugene Feenberg Memorial Medal 2007. For his work in science communication, he received the 2001 Kalinga Prize, awarded by UNESCO. He also received the Award Piazzano in 2002, to have founded and directed the Master in Science communication; in 2006, the Pirelli Internet-ional prize for the multimedia initiative Ulysses in the net of science; in 2007, the Capo d’Orlando prize for his activities in science communication.

== Selected works ==
- Fantoni, S.; Rosati, S. (1974). "Jastrow correlations and an irreducible cluster expansion for infinite boson or fermion systems". Il Nuovo Cimento A. 20 (1): 179–193.
- Fantoni, S.; Rosati, S. (1975). "The hypernetted-chain approximation for a fermion system". Il Nuovo Cimento A. 25 (4): 593–615.
- Fantoni, S.; Friman, B.L.; Pandharipande, V.R. (1981). "The imaginary part of the nucleon optical potential in nuclear matter". Physics Letters B. 104 (2): 89–91.
- Manousakis, E.; Fantoni, S.; Pandharipande, V.R.; Usmani, Q.N. (1983). "Comparative study of three-nucleon potentials in nuclear matter". Physical Review B. 28 (7): 3770.
- Fantoni, S.; Pandharipande, V.R. (1984). "Momentum distribution of nucleons in nuclear matter". Nuclear Physics A. 427 (3): 473–492.
- Benhar, O.; Fabrocini, A.; Fantoni, S. (1989). "The nucleon spectral function in nuclear matter". Nuclear Physics A. 505 (2): 267–299.
- Wang, X.Q.; Fantoni, S.; Tosatti, E.; Yu, Lu; Viviani, M. (1990). "Correlated-basis-function method for fermions on a lattice: The one-dimensional Hubbard model". Physical Review B. 41 (16): 11479.
- Pederiva, F.; Ferrante, A.; Fantoni, S.; Reatto, L. (1994). "Quantum theory of solid-liquid coexistence and interface in He 4". Physical Review Letters. 72 (16): 2589.
- Pederiva, F.; Chester, G.V.; Fantoni, S.; Reatto, L. (1997). "Variational study of vacancies in solid 4 He with shadow wave functions". Physical Review B. 56 (10): 5909.
- Smerzi, A.; Fantoni, S.; Giovanazzi, S.; Shenoy, S.R. (1997). "Quantum coherent atomic tunneling between two trapped Bose-Einstein condensates". Physical Review Letters. 79 (25): 4950.
- Ciftja, O.; Fantoni, S. (1998). "Fermi-hypernetted-chain study of unprojected wave functions to describe the half-filled state of the fractional quantum Hall effect". Physical Review B. 58 (12): 7898.
- Schmidt, K.E.; Fantoni, S. (1999). "A quantum Monte Carlo method for nucleon systems". Physics Letters B. 446 (2): 99–103.
- Wang, X.Q.; Fantoni, S.; Tosatti, E.; Yu, Lu; Viviani, M. (2003). "Structure, rotational dynamics, and superfluidity of small OCS-doped He clusters". Physical Review Letters. 90 (14): 143401.
- Gandolfi, F.; Pederiva, F.; Fantoni, S.; Schmidt, K.E. (2007). "Quantum Monte Carlo calculations of symmetric nuclear matter". Physical Review Letters. 98 (10): 102503.
- Gandolfi, S.; Illarionov, A.Y.; Fantoni, S.; Pederiva, F.; Schmidt, K.E. (2008). "Equation of State of Superfluid Neutron Matter and the Calculation of the S 0 1 Pairing Gap". Physical Review Letters. 101 (13): 132501.
- Lovato, A.; Benhar, O.; Fantoni, S.; Illarionov, A.Y.; Schmidt, K.E. (2011). "Density-dependent nucleon-nucleon interaction from three-nucleon forces". Physical Review C. 83 (5): 054003.
- Lovato, A.; Benhar, O.; Fantoni, S.; Schmidt, K.E. (2012). "Comparative study of three-nucleon potentials in nuclear matter". Physical Review C. 85 (2): 024003.

== Bibliography ==
- Benhar, O.; Fantoni, S. (2020). Nuclear Matter Theory. CRC Press. ISBN 978-0-8153-8666-7.
- Fantoni, S.; Krotscheck, E.; Fabrocini, A. (2002). Introduction to Modern Methods of Quantum Many-Body Theory and Their Applications. Imperial College Pr. ISBN 978-9-8123-8069-2.
- Fantoni, S.; Rosati, S. (1991). Condensed Matter Theories. Plenum Pub Corp. ISBN 978-0-3064-3839-4.
