= Eugene Feenberg Memorial Medal =

Physics award

The Eugene Feenberg Memorial Medal (also Feenberg Award) is a prize for quantum many-body theory named for American physicist Eugene Feenberg. It has been awarded at the International Conference on recent progress in many-body theory since 1985 by an international advisory committee to the conference.

== Recipients ==
- 1985: David Pines
- 1987: John W. Clark
- 1989: Malvin H. Kalos
- 1991: Walter Kohn
- 1994: David M. Ceperly
- 1997: Lev Pitaevskii
- 1999: Anthony James Leggett
- 2001: Philippe Nozieres
- 2004: Spartak Belyaev, Lev Gor'kov
- 2005: Raymond F. Bishop, Hermann Kümmel
- 2007: Stefano Fantoni, Eckhard Krotscheck
- 2009: John Dirk Walecka
- 2011: Gordon Baym, Leonid Keldysch
- 2013: Patrick A. Lee, Douglas Scalapino
- 2015: Christopher Pethick
- 2017: Jordi Boronat
- 2019: Steven R. White
- 2022: Antoine Georges, Gabriel Kotliar, Dieter Vollhardt
- 2024 Eduardo Fradkin, Alexei Tsvelik
- 2026: Matthew Fisher, Leonid Glazman, Charles Kane
