= Giuseppe Carleo =

Italian physicist

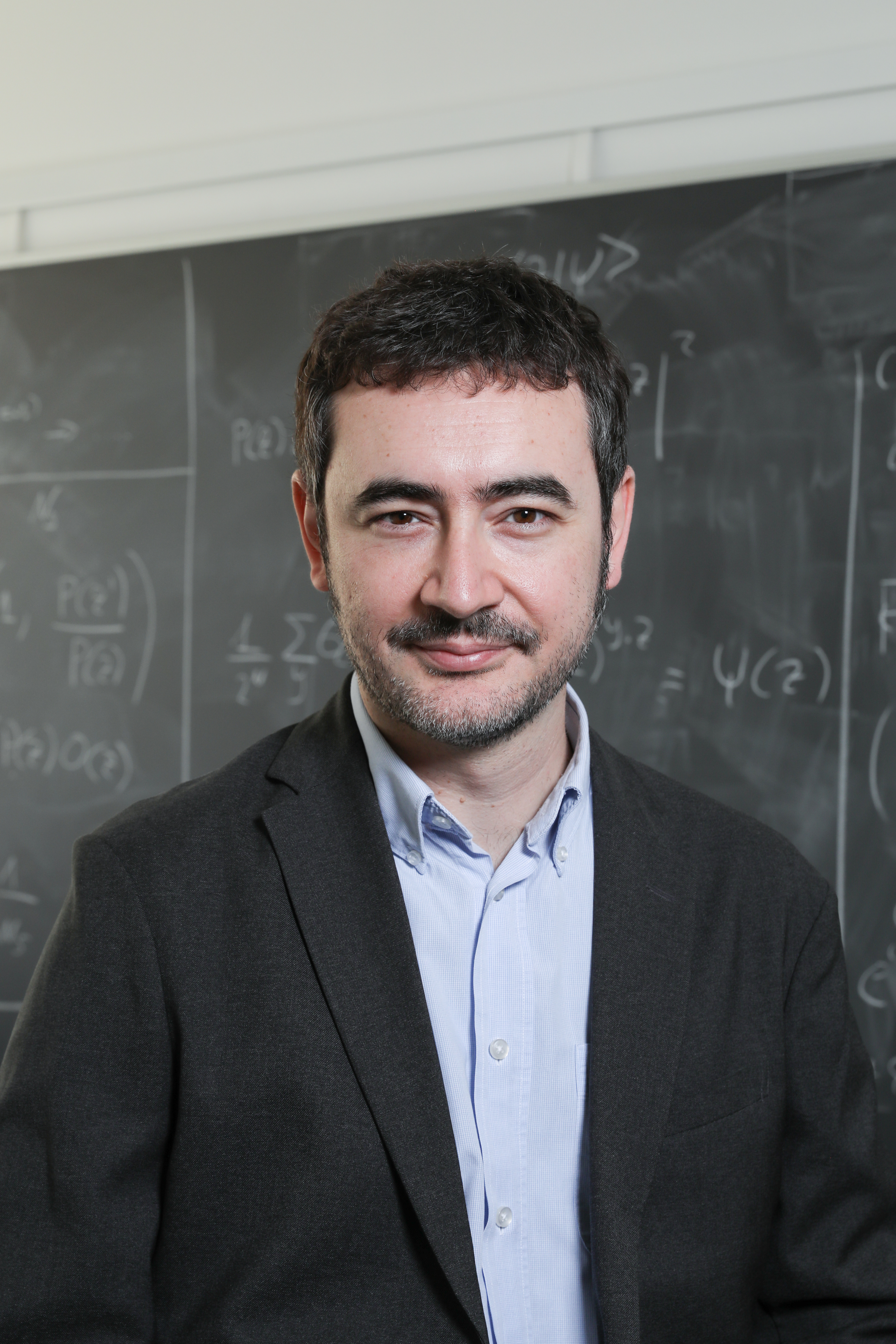
- Giuseppe Carleo in 2021
- Born: 1984 (age 41–42)
- Citizenship: Italian
- Known for: Neural network quantum states Time-dependent variational Monte Carlo

Academic background
- Education: Physics
- Alma mater: Sapienza University of Rome; International School for Advanced Studies
- Thesis: Spectral and dynamical properties of strongly correlated systems (2011)
- Doctoral advisor: Stefano Baroni
- Other advisor: Matthias Troyer

Academic work
- Discipline: Physics
- Sub-discipline: Computational physics
- Institutions: EPFL (École Polytechnique Fédérale de Lausanne)
- Main interests: Machine learning Quantum computing Condensed matter physics
- Website: https://www.epfl.ch/labs/cqsl/

Giuseppe Carleo (born 1984) is an Italian physicist. He is a professor of computational physics at EPFL (École Polytechnique Fédérale de Lausanne) and the head of the Laboratory of Computational Quantum Science.

== Career ==
Carleo studied physics at the Sapienza University of Rome and in 2011 earned his PhD in theoretical physics at the International School for Advanced Studies under the supervision of Stefano Baroni. His thesis on "Spectral and dynamical properties of strongly correlated systems" was dedicated to novel numerical simulation techniques to study condensed-matter systems, such as the time-dependent variational Monte Carlo.

As a Marie Curie Fellow he joined the École supérieure d'optique to work in the Lab directed by Alain Aspect on theoretically model and simulate ultra-cold atoms systems. In 2015, he went to work with the group of Matthias Troyer at the ETH Zurich where he later became a lecturer of computational quantum physics. Here he investigated the idea of representing complex quantum systems using artificial neural networks and machine learning techniques, developing a family of variational states known as neural network quantum states. In 2018, as research scientist and project leader he joined the Center for Computational Quantum Physics at Flatiron Institute of the Simons Foundation in New York City. Here he became a member of a team of researchers developing numerical methods at the intersection of machine learning and quantum science. Since 2018 he has been leading the open-source project NetKet.

Since 2020 he has been a professor of quantum computing at EPFL and the head of the Laboratory of Computational Quantum Science at the EPFL's School of Basic Sciences.

== Research ==
Carleo's main focus is the development of methods in computational science to study challenging problems involving strongly interacting quantum systems and quantum computing.

In 2016, he introduced a representation of many-particle quantum wave functions based on artificial neural networks. This approach is known as neural network quantum states and constitutes one of the early applications of machine learning techniques in modern many-body quantum physics. An application of this representation is for example used for quantum tomography of interacting Rydberg atoms.

In 2011, he also co-developed the time-dependent variational Monte Carlo method, a technique to simulate the dynamics of quantum systems using variational Monte Carlo. This approach is used for example to simulate the dynamics of two-dimensional interacting quantum models.

Carleo has also contributed to the development of quantum algorithms, especially in the context of variational quantum simulation.

His research has been featured in news outlets such as New Scientist, Ars Technica, Physics World, Chemistry World, and Vice. Some of his lectures are also available on YouTube.

== Distinctions ==
He is a scholar at the ELLIS Society (since 2020) and a member of the editorial board of Machine Learning Science and Technology (since 2019).

== Selected works ==
- Carleo, Giuseppe; Troyer, Matthias (2017-02-10). "Solving the quantum many-body problem with artificial neural networks". Science. 355 (6325): 602–606. arXiv:1606.02318. Bibcode:2017Sci...355..602C. doi:10.1126/science.aag2302. ISSN 0036-8075. PMID 28183973. S2CID 206651104.
- Torlai, Giacomo; Mazzola, Guglielmo; Carrasquilla, Juan; Troyer, Matthias; Melko, Roger; Carleo, Giuseppe (May 2018). "Neural-network quantum state tomography". Nature Physics. 14 (5): 447–450. arXiv:1703.05334. Bibcode:2018NatPh..14..447T. doi:10.1038/s41567-018-0048-5. ISSN 1745-2473. S2CID 125415859.
- Carleo, Giuseppe; Cirac, Ignacio; Cranmer, Kyle; Daudet, Laurent; Schuld, Maria; Tishby, Naftali; Vogt-Maranto, Leslie; Zdeborová, Lenka (2019-12-06). "Machine learning and the physical sciences". Reviews of Modern Physics. 91 (4) 045002. arXiv:1903.10563. Bibcode:2019RvMP...91d5002C. doi:10.1103/RevModPhys.91.045002. ISSN 0034-6861. S2CID 85517132.
- Carleo, Giuseppe; Becca, Federico; Schiró, Marco; Fabrizio, Michele (2012-02-06). "Localization and Glassy Dynamics Of Many-Body Quantum Systems". Scientific Reports. 2 (1): 243. arXiv:1109.2516. Bibcode:2012NatSR...2E.243C. doi:10.1038/srep00243. ISSN 2045-2322. PMC 3272662. PMID 22355756.
- Stokes, James; Izaac, Josh; Killoran, Nathan; Carleo, Giuseppe (2020-05-25). "Quantum Natural Gradient". Quantum. 4: 269. arXiv:1909.02108. Bibcode:2020Quant...4..269S. doi:10.22331/q-2020-05-25-269. ISSN 2521-327X. S2CID 202537631.
- Hartmann, Michael J.; Carleo, Giuseppe (2019-06-28). "Neural-Network Approach to Dissipative Quantum Many-Body Dynamics". Physical Review Letters. 122 (25) 250502. arXiv:1902.05131. Bibcode:2019PhRvL.122y0502H. doi:10.1103/PhysRevLett.122.250502. PMID 31347862. S2CID 119357494.
- Carleo, Giuseppe; Nomura, Yusuke; Imada, Masatoshi (2018-12-14). "Constructing exact representations of quantum many-body systems with deep neural networks". Nature Communications. 9 (1): 5322. arXiv:1802.09558. Bibcode:2018NatCo...9.5322C. doi:10.1038/s41467-018-07520-3. ISSN 2041-1723. PMC 6294148. PMID 30552316. S2CID 54631964.
- Melko, Roger G.; Carleo, Giuseppe; Carrasquilla, Juan; Cirac, J. Ignacio (2019-09-01). "Restricted Boltzmann machines in quantum physics". Nature Physics. 15 (9): 887–892. Bibcode:2019NatPh..15..887M. doi:10.1038/s41567-019-0545-1. ISSN 1745-2481. S2CID 195367448.
- Choo, Kenny; Mezzacapo, Antonio; Carleo, Giuseppe (2020-05-12). "Fermionic neural-network states for ab-initio electronic structure". Nature Communications. 11 (1): 2368. arXiv:1909.12852. Bibcode:2020NatCo..11.2368C. doi:10.1038/s41467-020-15724-9. ISSN 2041-1723. PMC 7217823. PMID 32398658.
