= QMC@Home =

BOINC based volunteer computing project

- QMC@Home screensaver
- Operating system: cross-platform
- Platform: BOINC

QMC@Home was a volunteer computing project for the BOINC client aimed at further developing and testing Quantum Monte Carlo (QMC) for use in quantum chemistry. It is hosted by the University of Münster with participation by the Cavendish Laboratory. QMC@Home allows volunteers from around the world to donate idle computer cycles to help calculate molecular geometry using Diffusion Monte Carlo.

The project is developing a new application using density functional theory.

The project began its Beta testing on 23 May 2006. As of February 2010, QMC@Home has about 7,500 active participants from 102 countries, contributing about 5 teraFLOPS of computation power.

== Workunits ==
In order to get results from home computers the work is split into "workunits". The time it takes to complete a workunit depends on the size of the calculated system and the speed of the user's computer. The target time is between 4 and 48 hours on a 2.4 GHz system.

This is a list of molecules recently tested: 1a Ammonia; 1 Ammonia dimer; 2a Water; 2 Water dimer; 3a Formic acid; 3 Formic acid dimer; 4a Formamide; 4 Formamide dimer; 5a Uracil; 5 Uracil dimer; 6a 2-pyridoxine; 6b 2-aminopyridine; 6 2-pyridoxine/2-aminopyridine; 7a Adenine; 7b Thymine; 7 Adenine/thymine WC; 8a Methane; 8 Methane dimer; 9a Ethene; 9 Ethene dimer; 10 Benzene/methane; 11a Benzene; 11 Benzene dimer; 12a Pyrazine; 12 Pyrazine dimer; 13 Uracil dimer; 14a Indole; 14 Indole/benzene; 15 Adenine/thymine stack; 16b Ethyne; 16 Ethene/ethyne; 17 Benzene/water; 18 Benzene/ammonia; 19b Hydrogen cyanide; 19 Benzene/hydrogen cyanide; 20 Benzene dimer; 21 Indole/benzene; 22a Phenol; 22 Phenol dimer

== See also ==
- List of volunteer computing projects
