= John Walter Clark =

American physicist

John W. Clark
- Born: 1935 (age 90–91); Lockhart, Texas
- Education: University of Texas at Austin (BS 1955, MA 1957); Washington University in St. Louis (PhD, 1959)
- Awards: Sloan Foundation Fellowship; Fellow of the American Physical Society; Eugene Feenberg Memorial Medal for Many-Body Physics
- Scientific career
- Fields: Nuclear physics Many-body theory Neural network
- Workplaces: Washington University in St. Louis
- Doctoral advisor: Eugene Feenberg
- Other academic advisors: Eugene Wigner

John Walter Clark (born 1935), is Wayman Crow Professor of Physics emeritus at Washington University in St. Louis, and a recipient of the Eugene Feenberg Medal in 1987 for his contributions to many-body theory.

== Biography ==
John Clark was born in 1935 in Lockhart, Texas. He received his BS and MA degrees in physics from the University of Texas at Austin in 1955 and 1957, respectively. He then earned his Ph.D. in Physics under the supervision of Eugene Feenberg at Washington University in St. Louis in 1959. He was a National Science Foundation Postdoctoral Fellow at Princeton University advised by Eugene Wigner and a NATO postdoctoral fellow at University of Birmingham and Saclay from 1959 to 1963. He named his son Eugene after his advisors. Author Mathilde Walter Clark is his daughter.

He became an assistant professor of physics in Arts and Sciences at Washington University in St. Louis in 1963, was department chair from 2002 to 2007, and succeeded Edwin T. Jaynes as the Wayman Crow Professor of Physics.

== Research and teaching ==
Clark is notable for his contributions to nuclear physics and many-body theory, Later in his career, he also turned his interests to neural nets. He taught "Physics of the Brain" for many years. He supervised over two dozen Ph.D. students and was notable for promoting women in the field.

== Awards ==
- Fellow, American Physical Society
- Alfred P. Sloan Foundation Fellowship (1965)
- Eugene Feenberg Medal for Many-Body Physics (1987)
- Wayman Crow Professorship in Physics (1999)
