= Variational Monte Carlo =

Algorithm in computational quantum physics

In computational physics, variational Monte Carlo (VMC) is a quantum Monte Carlo method that applies the variational method to approximate the ground state of a quantum system.

The basic building block is a generic wave function $| \Psi(a) \rangle$ depending on some parameters $a$. The optimal values of the parameters $a$ is then found upon minimizing the total energy of the system.

In particular, given the Hamiltonian $\mathcal{H}$, and denoting with $X$ a many-body configuration, the expectation value of the energy can be written as:

$$E(a) = \frac{\langle \Psi(a) | \mathcal{H} | \Psi(a) \rangle} {\langle \Psi(a) |  \Psi(a) \rangle } = \frac{\int | \Psi(X,a) | ^2 \frac{\mathcal{H}\Psi(X,a)}{\Psi(X,a)} \, dX} { \int | \Psi(X,a)|^2 \, dX}.$$

Following the Monte Carlo method for evaluating integrals, we can interpret $\frac{ | \Psi(X,a) | ^2 } { \int | \Psi(X,a) | ^2 \, dX }$ as a probability distribution function, sample it, and evaluate the energy expectation value $E(a)$ as the average of the so-called local energy $E_{\textrm{loc}}(X) = \frac{\mathcal{H}\Psi(X,a)}{\Psi(X,a)}$. Once $E(a)$ is known for a given set of variational parameters $a$, then optimization is performed in order to minimize the energy and obtain the best possible representation of the ground-state wave-function.

VMC is no different from any other variational method, except that the many-dimensional integrals are evaluated numerically. Monte Carlo integration is particularly crucial in this problem since the dimension of the many-body Hilbert space, comprising all the possible values of the configurations $X$, typically grows exponentially with the size of the physical system. Other approaches to the numerical evaluation of the energy expectation values would therefore, in general, limit applications to much smaller systems than those analyzable thanks to the Monte Carlo approach.

The accuracy of the method then largely depends on the choice of the variational state. The simplest choice typically corresponds to a mean-field form, where the state $\Psi$ is written as a factorization over the Hilbert space. This particularly simple form is typically not very accurate since it neglects many-body effects. One of the largest gains in accuracy over writing the wave function separably comes from the introduction of the so-called Jastrow factor. In this case the wave function is written as $\Psi(X) = \exp(\sum{u(r_{ij})})$, where $r_{ij}$ is the distance between a pair of quantum particles and $u(r)$ is a variational function to be determined. With this factor, we can explicitly account for particle-particle correlation, but the many-body integral becomes unseparable, so Monte Carlo is the only way to evaluate it efficiently. In chemical systems, slightly more sophisticated versions of this factor can obtain 80–90% of the correlation energy (see electronic correlation) with less than 30 parameters. In comparison, a configuration interaction calculation may require around 50,000 parameters to reach that accuracy, although it depends greatly on the particular case being considered. In addition, VMC usually scales as a small power of the number of particles in the simulation, usually something like N^{2−4} for calculation of the energy expectation value, depending on the form of the wave function.

== Wave function optimization in VMC ==
Quantum Monte Carlo (QMC) calculations crucially depend on the quality of the trial-function, and so it is essential to have an optimized wave-function as close as possible to the ground state. The problem of function optimization is a very important research topic in numerical simulation. In QMC, in addition to the usual difficulties to find the minimum of multidimensional parametric function, the statistical noise is present in the estimate of the cost function (usually the energy), and its derivatives, required for an efficient optimization.

Different cost functions and different strategies were used to optimize a many-body trial-function. Usually three cost functions were used in QMC optimization energy, variance or a linear combination of them. The variance optimization method has the advantage that the exact wavefunction's variance is known. (Because the exact wavefunction is an eigenfunction of the Hamiltonian, the variance of the local energy is zero). This means that variance optimization is ideal in that it is bounded from below, it is positive defined and its minimum is known. Energy minimization may ultimately prove more effective, however, as different authors recently showed that the energy optimization is more effective than the variance one.

There are different motivations for this: first, usually one is interested in the lowest energy rather than in the lowest variance in both variational and diffusion Monte Carlo; second, variance optimization takes many iterations to optimize determinant parameters and often the optimization can get stuck in multiple local minimum and it suffers of the "false convergence" problem; third energy-minimized wave functions on average yield more accurate values of other expectation values than variance minimized wave functions do.

The optimization strategies can be divided into three categories. The first strategy is based on correlated sampling together with deterministic optimization methods. Even if this idea yielded very accurate results for the first-row atoms, this procedure can have problems if parameters affect the nodes, and moreover density ratio of the current and initial trial-function increases exponentially with the size of the system. In the second strategy one use a large bin to evaluate the cost function and its derivatives in such way that the noise can be neglected and deterministic methods can be used.

The third approach, is based on an iterative technique to handle directly with noise functions. The first example of these methods is the so-called Stochastic Gradient Approximation (SGA), that was used also for structure optimization. Recently an improved and faster approach of this kind was proposed the so-called Stochastic Reconfiguration (SR) method.

== VMC and deep learning ==
In 2017, Giuseppe Carleo and Matthias Troyer used a VMC objective function to train an artificial neural network to find the ground state of a quantum mechanical system. More generally, artificial neural networks are being used as a wave function ansatz (known as neural network quantum states) in VMC frameworks for finding ground states of quantum mechanical systems. The use of neural network ansatzes for VMC has been extended to fermions, enabling electronic structure calculations that are significantly more accurate than VMC calculations which do not use neural networks.

== See also ==
- Metropolis–Hastings algorithm
- Rayleigh–Ritz method
- Time-dependent variational Monte Carlo
