= Eckhard Krotscheck =

American physicist

Eckhard Krotscheck (born 1944) is an American physicist and inventor of Fermi hypernetted-chain theory.

Krotscheck is currently a SUNY Distinguished Professor at the State University of New York and a published author. He is also a Fellow of the American Physical Society. In 2007, he received the Eugene Feenberg Memorial Medal.
