= Auxiliary-field Monte Carlo =

Auxiliary-field Monte Carlo is a method that allows the calculation, by use of Monte Carlo techniques, of averages of operators in many-body quantum mechanical (Blankenbecler 1981, Ceperley 1977) or classical problems (Baeurle 2004, Baeurle 2003, Baeurle 2002a).

== Reweighting procedure and numerical sign problem ==
The distinctive ingredient of "auxiliary-field Monte Carlo" is the fact that the interactions are decoupled by means of the application of the Hubbard–Stratonovich transformation, which permits the reformulation of many-body theory in terms of a scalar auxiliary-field representation. This reduces the many-body problem to the calculation of a sum or integral over all possible auxiliary-field configurations. In this sense, there is a trade-off: instead of dealing with one very complicated many-body problem, one faces the calculation of an infinite number of simple external-field problems.

It is here, as in other related methods, that Monte Carlo enters the game in the guise of importance sampling: the large sum over auxiliary-field configurations is performed by sampling over the most important ones, with a certain probability. In classical statistical physics, this probability is usually given by the (positive semi-definite) Boltzmann factor. Similar factors arise also in quantum field theories; however, these can have indefinite sign (especially in the case of Fermions) or even be complex-valued, which precludes their direct interpretation as probabilities. In these cases, one has to resort to a reweighting procedure (i.e., interpret the absolute value as probability and multiply the sign or phase to the observable) to get a strictly positive reference distribution suitable for Monte Carlo sampling. However, it is well known that, in specific parameter ranges of the model under consideration, the oscillatory nature of the weight function can lead to a bad statistical convergence of the numerical integration procedure. The problem is known as the numerical sign problem and can be alleviated with analytical and numerical convergence acceleration procedures (Baeurle 2002, Baeurle 2003a).

== See also ==
- Quantum Monte Carlo

== Implementations ==
- ALF
- QUEST
- QMCPACK
