= Gaussian quantum Monte Carlo =

Gaussian Quantum Monte Carlo is a quantum Monte Carlo method that shows a potential solution to the fermion sign problem without the deficiencies of alternative approaches. Instead of the Hilbert space, this method works in the space of density matrices that can be spanned by an over-complete basis of gaussian operators using only positive coefficients. Containing only quadratic forms of the fermionic operators, no anti-commuting variables occur and any quantum state can be expressed as a real probability distribution.
