= Edwin C. Kemble =

American physicist

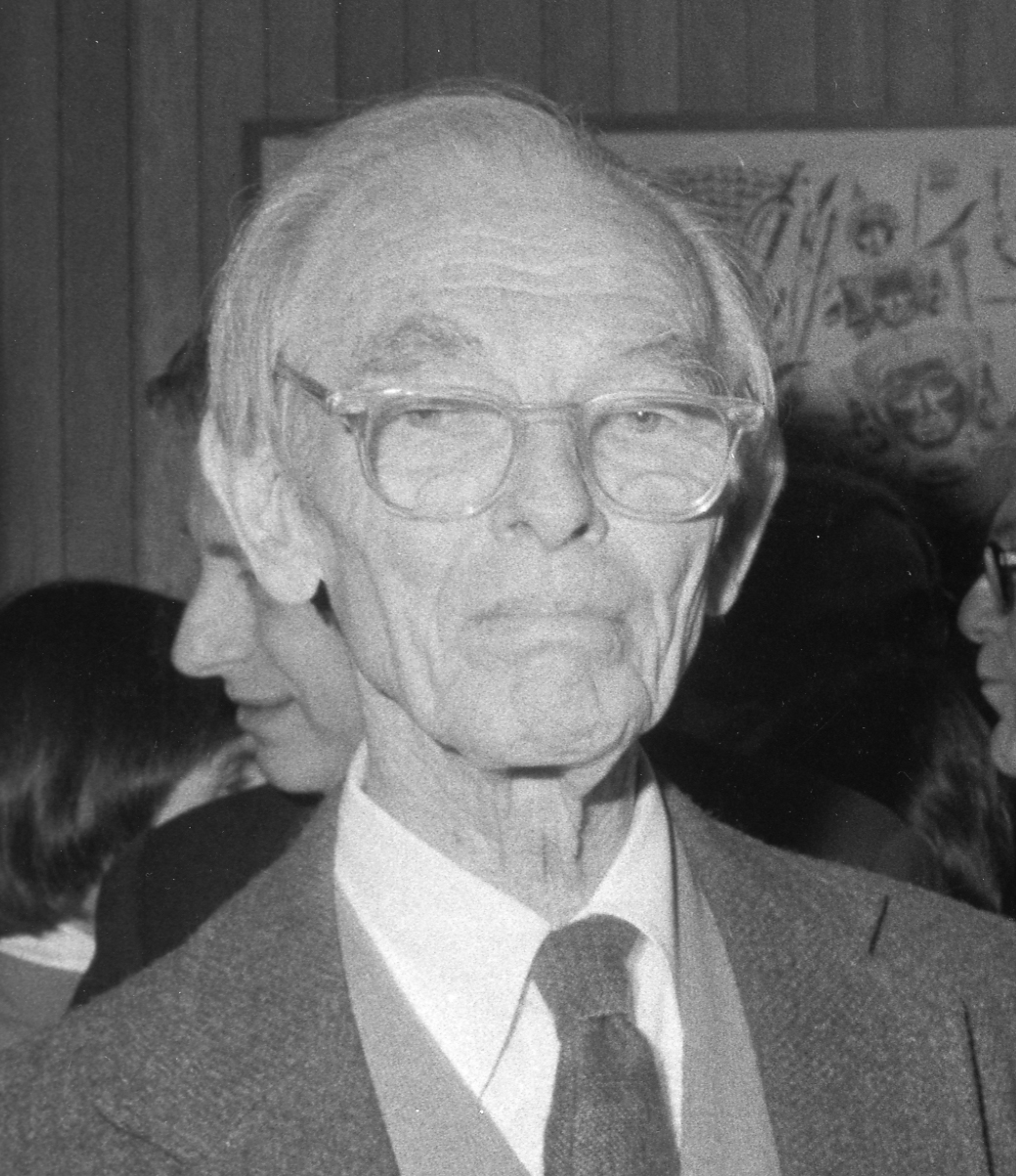
- Kemble in 1979
- Born: 28 January 1889; Delaware, Ohio, United States
- Died: 12 April 1984 (aged 95)
- Education: Harvard University
- Scientific career
- Workplaces: Harvard University
- Thesis: (1917)
- Doctoral advisor: Percy Williams Bridgman
- Doctoral students: John Hasbrouck Van Vleck; Clarence Zener; Eugene Feenberg

Edwin Crawford Kemble (January 28, 1889, in Delaware, Ohio – March 12, 1984) was an American physicist who made contributions to the theory of quantum mechanics and molecular structure and spectroscopy. During World War II, he was a consultant to the Navy on acoustic detection of submarines and to the Army on Operation Alsos.

== Education ==
Kemble began college in 1906 at Ohio Wesleyan University, but he stayed there only one year. He then transferred to the Case School of Applied Science, where he received his B.S. in physics in 1911. At Case, Kemble was a student of Dayton C. Miller, a nationally recognized scientist working in the field of acoustics. Upon graduation from Case, he spent the following year as a physics instructor at the Carnegie Institute of Technology in Pittsburgh, a school founded in response to the growing demand for education in technology, as was Case. During that year, Miller obtained a graduate fellowship for Kemble at Harvard; the fellowship was personally financed by Harvard Professor Wallace Sabine, a colleague of Miller's in acoustics. Kemble entered graduate school in 1913, with Percy Bridgman as his thesis advisor. This was the year Niels Bohr submitted his first paper on the Bohr model of the hydrogen atom. Universities in Europe were in the process of making the transition from the predominance of experimental physics to that of theoretical physics, as was the case in the United States. Bridgman, a well-known experimentalist, did, however, champion Kemble's interest in pursuing theoretical interests in physics. Kemble was drawn to the new quantum theories in a course on radiation by G. W. Pierce. It was while considering thesis topics that Kemble was drawn to the recently introduced quantum theory of molecular spectra. He received his Ph.D. in physics from Harvard in 1917.

== Career ==
After Kemble received his doctorate, with World War I in progress, he spent a short time doing work which contributed to the war effort developing aircraft engines at Curtiss Aeroplane and Motor Company. As the War ended, he was laid off. While he did want to return to Harvard, a position could not immediately be found, so he spent a half semester teaching at Williams College, in Williamstown, Massachusetts. Bridgman had a plan to build up theory at Harvard, which consisted of restructuring from the emphasis on electromagnetism (radiotelegraphy, optics, and wave propagation) to radiation theory, quantum theory, photo-electricity, specific heats, X-ray crystal structure, and special topics in physics theory. Kemble accepted the challenge and returned to Harvard in 1919 as an assistant professor in the physics department, the year Arnold Sommerfeld published Atombau und Spektrallinien, which became the “bible” of atomic theory for the new generation of physicists who developed atomic and quantum physics. Kemble remained there the rest of his career as instructor (1919–1924), assistant professor (1924–1927), associate professor (1927–1930), and professor (1930–1957). He was made chairman of the department in 1940. His first graduate student was John Van Vleck. Many other doctoral students and postdoctoral students/researchers followed in the next fifteen years, including Robert S. Mulliken, John C. Slater, J. Robert Oppenheimer, Clarence Zener, James H. Bartlett, Eugene Feenberg, and J. L. Dunham.

Kemble was at the center of research and development of the theory of molecular structure. Having been instrumental in introducing quantum theory in the United States, he went on to chair the National Research Council's Committee on Radiation in Gasses, which took three years (1923–1926) to prepare the report Molecular Spectra in Gases and served as a coordinating group for national research programs. Kemble represented the east coast and Harvard, Harrison Randall's infrared spectroscopy laboratory at the University of Michigan was represented by Walter F. Colby, and Raymond T. Birge spoke for the west coast and the University of California, Berkeley.

The rise of quantum mechanics was greatly fostered in Europe in the 1920s by the consortium consisting of the three Institutes for Theoretical Physics which were under Arnold Sommerfeld at the Ludwig-Maximilians-Universität München, Max Born at the University of Göttingen, and Niels Bohr at the University of Copenhagen. Sommerfeld taught many of the leading young scientists then developing quantum mechanics or sorting out atomic and molecular structure from spectroscopic data. In 1925, Born and Werner Heisenberg, who got his doctorate from Sommerfeld in 1923 and completed his Habilitation under Born in 1924, introduced the matrix mechanics formulation of quantum mechanics. This was followed in early 1926, by Erwin Schrödinger introducing the wave mechanics formulation of quantum mechanics. So, it was into this stimulating environment that Kemble went to study and do research with both Sommerfeld in Munich and Born in Göttingen, on a Guggenheim Fellowship in 1927-1928. Upon his return to the United States, he wrote, with Edward L. Hill, two lengthy reviews of quantum mechanics in the first issues of Reviews of Modern Physics.

During World War II, Kemble supervised the teaching of basic physics to military officers, consulted with for the Navy on acoustic detection of submarines, and near the end of the war consulted for the Army on Operation Alsos. The objective of Alsos was to investigate the German nuclear energy efforts, seize German nuclear resources, materials and personnel to further American research and to prevent their capture by the Soviets, and to discern how far the Germans had gone towards creating an atomic bomb. Samuel Goudsmit, a quantum physicist from the University of Michigan, was the scientific leader of ALSOS, and Lt. Col. Boris Pash, a former Manhattan Project security officer, was its military leader.

At the end of WW II, Kemble had the opportunity to continue his wartime interest in teaching physics to non-physicists. In reacting to the role science played in the war, James B. Conant, president of Harvard and former high-level administrator in the Manhattan Project, proposed teaching science to all Harvard undergraduates by teaching them the history of science and highlighting the importance of science to social change. Kemble joined I. Bernard Cohen, Gerald Holton, Thomas S. Kuhn, Philippe Le Corbeiller, and Leonard K. Nash in this project.

In 1957, Kemble retired from Harvard, where he had spent all but three years since he entered graduate school. For the next three years, he was the director of Harvard's Academic Year Institute, where high-school teachers studied with university professors. He had served as chairman of the Physics Section of the National Academy of Sciences (1945–1948) and as a member of the Executive Committee of the National Research Councils’ Division of Physical Sciences.

Edwin C. Kemble died on March 12, 1984.

== Personal ==
In 1925, Kemble married Harriet May Tindle, who died two years before their 50th wedding anniversary. He was a devout Christian. In 1978, he married Martha Chadbourne Kettelle, his Radcliffe College fiancée from graduate student days.

== Books ==
- Edwin C. Kemble and others Molecular Spectra in Gases (National Research Council, Washington DC, 1926)
- Edwin C. Kemble Physical Science, Its Structure and Development: From Geometric Astronomy to the Mechanical Theory of Heat (M.I.T. Press, 1966)
- Edwin C. Kemble Physical Science, Its Structure and Development—Vol. 2 (1970)
- Edwin C. Kemble The Fundamental Principles of Quantum Mechanics with Elementary Applications (McGraw Hill, 1937) (Dover, 1958 and 2005)

== Selected Literature ==
- Kemble, E. C. (1 September 1921). "The Evaluation of Quantum Integrals". Proceedings of the National Academy of Sciences. 7 (10): 283–288. Bibcode:1921PNAS....7..283K. doi:10.1073/pnas.7.10.283. ISSN 0027-8424. PMC 1084899. PMID 16576608.
- Kemble, Edwin C. (1 September 1929). "The General Principles of Quantum Mechanics. Part I". Reviews of Modern Physics. 1 (2). American Physical Society (APS): 157–215. Bibcode:1929RvMP....1..157K. doi:10.1103/revmodphys.1.157. ISSN 0034-6861.
- Kemble, E. C.; Hill, E. L. (1 December 1929). "The General Principles of Quantum Mechanics. Part II". Reviews of Modern Physics. 2 (1). American Physical Society (APS): 1–59. doi:10.1103/revmodphys.2.1. ISSN 0034-6861.
