= Time-dependent variational Monte Carlo =

The time-dependent variational Monte Carlo (t-VMC) method is a quantum Monte Carlo approach to study the dynamics of closed, non-relativistic quantum systems in the context of the quantum many-body problem. It is an extension of the variational Monte Carlo method, in which a time-dependent pure quantum state is encoded by some variational wave function, generally parametrized as

$$\Psi(X,t) = \exp \left ( \sum_k a_k(t) O_k(X) \right )$$

where the complex-valued $a_k(t)$ are time-dependent variational parameters, $X$ denotes a many-body configuration and $O_k(X)$ are time-independent operators that define the specific ansatz. The time evolution of the parameters $a_k(t)$ can be found upon imposing a variational principle to the wave function. In particular one can show that the optimal parameters for the evolution satisfy at each time the equation of motion

$$i \sum_{k^{\prime}}\langle O_k O_{k^{\prime}}\rangle_t^c \dot{a}_{k^{\prime}}=\langle O_k \mathcal{H}\rangle_t^c,$$

where $\mathcal{H}$ is the Hamiltonian of the system, $\langle AB \rangle_t^c=\langle AB\rangle_t-\langle A\rangle_t\langle B\rangle_t$ are connected averages, and the quantum expectation values are taken over the time-dependent variational wave function, i.e., $\langle\cdots\rangle_t \equiv\langle\Psi(t)|\cdots|\Psi(t)\rangle$.

In analogy with the Variational Monte Carlo approach and following the Monte Carlo method for evaluating integrals, we can interpret $\frac{ | \Psi(X,t) | ^2 } { \int | \Psi(X,t) | ^2 \, dX }$ as a probability distribution function over the multi-dimensional space spanned by the many-body configurations $X$. The Metropolis–Hastings algorithm is then used to sample exactly from this probability distribution and, at each time $t$, the quantities entering the equation of motion are evaluated as statistical averages over the sampled configurations. The trajectories $a(t)$ of the variational parameters are then found upon numerical integration of the associated differential equation.
