= AERES =

French academic research evaluation agency

AERES logo

AERES, the Agence d'évaluation de la recherche et de l'enseignement supérieur, was a French academic research evaluation agency. AERES was set up as a result of a 2006 law relating to research, and had the task of "evaluating research and higher education institutions, research organisations, research units, higher education programmes and degrees and with approving their staff evaluation procedures". It has been replaced by the HCERES in 2013.

The Italian ANVUR agency was partly modelled on AERES.
