= Fa-Yueh Wu =

Chinese-American physicist and mathematician (1932–2020)

- Born: January 5, 1932; Shimen County, Hunan Province, Republic of China
- Died: January 21, 2020 (aged 88); Newton, Massachusetts, United States
- Education: Republic of China Navy Mechanical School; National Tsing Hua University; Washington University in St. Louis
- Children: 3
- Scientific career
- Fields: statistical mechanics solid-state physics
- Workplaces: Virginia Tech; Northeastern University
- Doctoral advisor: Eugene Feenberg

Fa-Yueh Wu (January 5, 1932 – January 21, 2020) was a Chinese-born theoretical physicist, mathematical physicist, and mathematician who studied and contributed to solid-state physics and statistical mechanics.

== Life ==
=== Early stage ===
Born on January 5, 1932, in Shimen County, Hunan Province, Republic of China, with his father, a member of the Legislature, as his fourth child. The temporary capital of the Chiang Kai-shek administration of Nationalist government was placed in Chongqing in December 1938, but before that, in 1937, he evacuated to Chongqing with his father and stepmother and entered an elementary school there. However, due to repeated Bombing of Chongqing, he was unable to settle in one place. In 1943, he enrolled in Nankai Junior High School, which was evacuated to Chongqing at the time. He transferred to a high school in Nanjing, which became the capital of Chiang Kai-shek administration again in 1946, after the collapse of Wang Jingwei regime. In 1948 he moved to Changsha and transferred to another junior high school. In 1949, he fled to Taiwan with his father and stepmother due to the Chinese Civil War, but separated from the four siblings who remained on the continent. His parents died without being able to resume with their children.

=== Republic of China Navy ===
He enrolled in the Republic of China Navy Mechanical School in 1949, entered the Department of Electrical Engineering a year later, earned a bachelor's degree in 1954, served in the Republic of China Navy from 1954 to 1956, and became a lieutenant in the Navy. In 1955, he was selected to study radar engineering for half a year in San Francisco, USA. He was an expert of radar and sonar. He was also a master of Xiangqi.

=== Physics ===
He entered the National Tsing Hua University in 1957 and received a master's degree from the Institute of Atomic Sciences Physics Group in June 1959. He then went to the United States on a scholarship to study many-body problems under Eugene Feenberg at Washington University in St. Louis, and received his PhD in 1963. He was an assistant professor at Virginia Tech in 1963 and Northeastern University in 1967, an associate professor in 1969, and a professor in 1975. He has been a university professor since 1989 and Matthews professor since 1992. He has numerous academic treatises. In 1976, Wu was elected a fellow of the American Physical Society. After he retired in 2006, he became an emeritus professor. He died at his home in Newton, Massachusetts, on January 21, 2020.

== Books ==
- Lieb, Wu Two dimensional ferroelectric models. In: Domb, Green (Hrsg.): Phase transitions and critical phenomena. Band 1. Academic Press, 1972, S. 331–490 (Vertex-Modelle)
- The Potts Model. In: Reviews of Modern Physics, Band 54, 1982, S. 235–268
- Knot theory and statistical mechanics. In: Reviews of Modern Physics, Band 64, 1992, S. 1099–1131
- Knot invariants and statistical mechanics- a physicists perspective. In: M. Ge, C.-N. Yang (Hrsg.): Braid group, knot theory and statistical mechanics. World Scientific, 1993
- Exactly solvable models – a journey in statistical mechanics. Selected Papers with commentaries. World Scientific, 2009 (In: Chinese Journal of Physics, Band 40, 2002, No. 4)
