= International School for Advanced Studies =

Graduate School in Trieste, Italy

- Scuola Internazionale Superiore di Studi Avanzati
- Motto: ... ma per seguir virtute e canoscenza (... to follow virtue and knowledge)
- Type: State-supported graduate institute
- Established: 1978; 47 years ago
- Director: Andrea Romanino
- Administrative staff: 88
- Location: Trieste, Italy
- Website: www.sissa.it

The International School for Advanced Studies (Italian: Scuola Internazionale Superiore di Studi Avanzati; SISSA) is an international, state-supported, post-graduate-education and research institute in Trieste, Italy.

SISSA is active in the fields of mathematics, physics and neuroscience, offering both undergraduate and post-graduate courses. Each year, about 70 PhD students are admitted to SISSA based on their scientific qualifications. SISSA also runs master's programs in the same areas, in collaboration with both Italian and other European universities.

== History ==
SISSA was founded in 1978, as a part of the reconstruction following the Friuli earthquake of 1976. Although the city of Trieste itself did not suffer any damage, physicist Paolo Budinich asked and obtained from the Italian government to include in the interventions the institution of a new, post-graduate teaching and research institute, modeled on the Scuola Normale Superiore di Pisa. The school became operative with a PhD course in theoretical physics, and Budinich himself was appointed as general director.

In 1986, Budinich left his position to Daniele Amati, who at the time was at the head of the theoretical division at CERN. Under his leadership, SISSA expanded its teaching and research activity towards the field of neuroscience, and instituted a new interdisciplinary laboratory aiming at connecting humanities and scientific studies.

From 2001 to 2004, the director was the Italian geneticist Edoardo Boncinelli, who fostered the development of the existing research areas. From 2004 to 2010, the director was the Italian physicist Stefano Fantoni. His period as director has been characterized by the design and construction of the new SISSA location. Other directors were appointed in the following years, which saw the strengthening of SISSA collaboration with other Italian and European universities in offering master's degree programs in the three areas of the School (mathematics, physics and neuroscience). Physicist Stefano Ruffo served as the director from 2015 until 2021, when he was succeeded by Andrea Romanino.

== Campus ==
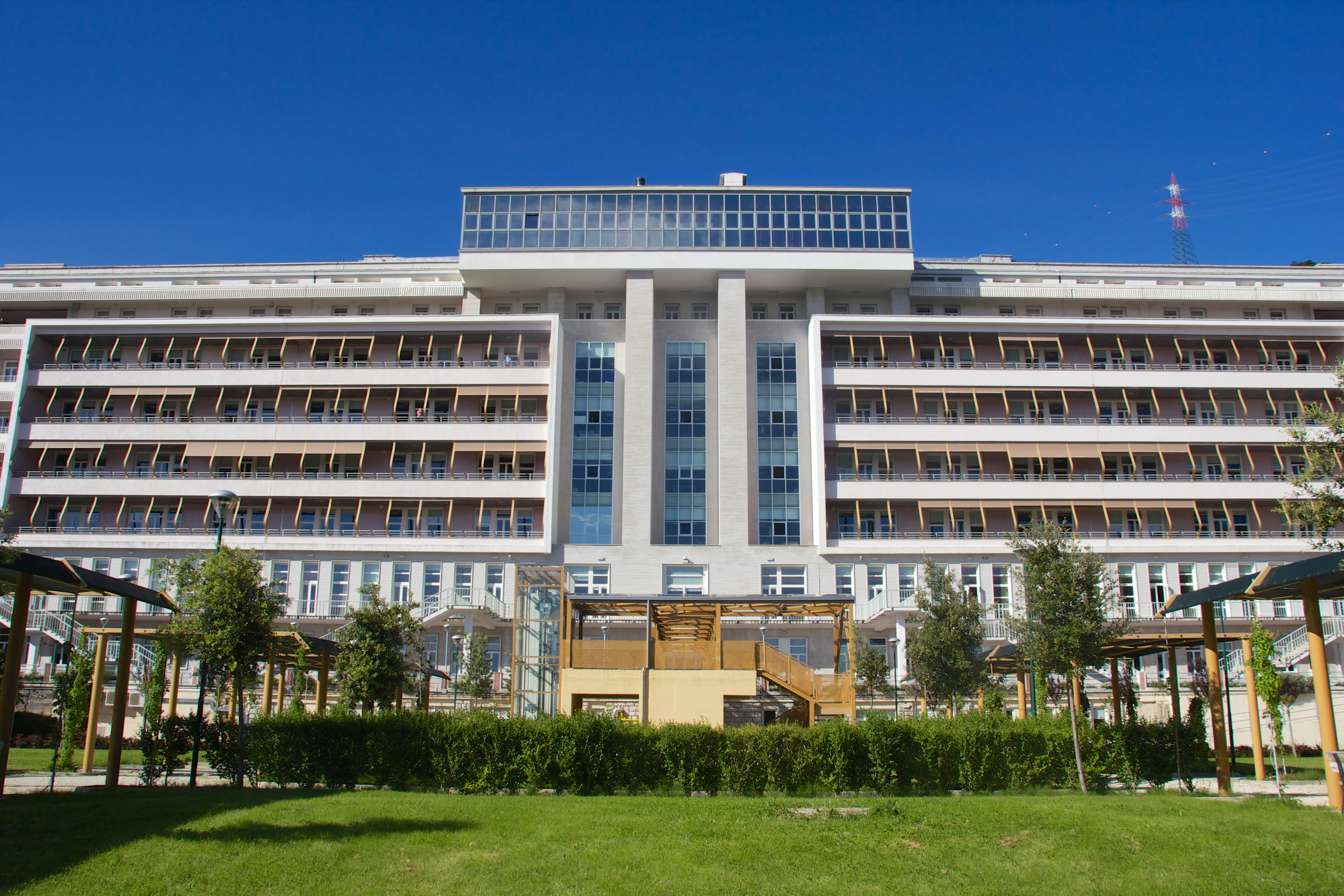
The SISSA building

Until July 2010, the school was located near the Miramare Park and marine reserve, about 10 kilometres from the city centre. The Miramare campus still hosts the ICTP (International Center for Theoretical Physics) and the Department of Theoretical Physics of the University of Trieste.

The campus is located in the borough of Opicina; it is accessible by bus 38 of Trieste Trasporti (TPL FVG). The campus is also equipped with a canteen, a kindergarten, a gym, as well as an open air theatre, which is used for shows, conferences and activities for the wider public.

== Departments ==
SISSA houses the following research groups in the field of Astroparticle Physics, Astrophysics, Condensed Matter, Molecular and Statistical Biophysics, Statistical Physics, Theoretical Particle Physics, Data Science, Cognitive Neuroscience Neurobiology, Molecular Biology, Applied Mathematics, Geometry Mathematical Analysis, and Mathematical Physics

In addition, there is the Interdisciplinary Laboratory for Natural and Humanistic Sciences (ILAS - Laboratorio Interdisciplinare Scienze Naturali e Umanistiche), which is endowed with the task of making connections between science, humanities, and the public. Since 1992 it also organizes a course in Science Communication and Scientific journalism.

SISSA also enjoys special teaching and scientific links with the International Centre for Theoretical Physics, the International Centre for Genetic Engineering and Biotechnology and the Elettra Synchrotron Light Laboratory. Ruffo signed a partnership with the International Centre for Genetic Engineering and Biotechnology to set up a new PhD program in Molecular Biology, with teaching activity organized by both institutions.

SISSA operates a 100 teraFLOPS supercomputer in partnership with the neighboring International Centre for Theoretical Physics. Moreover, it hosts a specialized library, a parallel Calculus Centre, several cellular-neurobiology laboratories, confocal microscopy and electronic microscopy facilities and multiple cognitive-neuroscience laboratories, which are also available to faculty and students of other scientific institutions in the Trieste area.

== Ranking ==
According to the last aggregate data issued by ANVUR - the Italian National Agency for the Evaluation of the University and Research Systems - SISSA ranks:

- first among medium-sized universities and research centers in physical science, with a 22% positive variance in the number of products compared to the Italian average;
- first among small-sized universities and research centers in biological science, owing to the activity carried out in neuroscience, with a 64% positive variance;
- second among small-sized universities in mathematical and computer science. With reference to the latter, the positive variance in the scientific production corresponded to 46% compared to the national average, placing SISSA 1% away from the Scuola Normale di Pisa.

== Publications ==
SISSA publishes or sponsors several scientific journals and conference proceedings:

- Journal of High Energy Physics (JHEP), with Springer, a peer-reviewed journal in particle physics
- Journal of Cosmology and Astroparticle Physics (JCAP), with IOP Publishing, a peer-reviewed journal in physical cosmology and astroparticle physics
- Journal of Statistical Mechanics: Theory and Experiment (JSTAT), with IOP Publishing, a peer-reviewed journal in statistical mechanics
- Journal of Instrumentation (JINST), with IOP Publishing, a peer-reviewed journal in instrumentations for particle accelerators
- Journal of Science Communication (JCOM), with IOP Publishing, a peer-reviewed journal in popular science
- JCOM América Latina (JCOMAL), published in-house by SISSA; a Spanish- and Portuguese-language peer-reviewed journal for popular science in Latin America
- Proceedings of Science (PoS), published in-house by SISSA, a non-peer-reviewed series of conference proceedings

== See also ==
- List of Italian universities
