= Lev Gor'kov =

Russian-American physicist (1929–2016)

Lev Petrovich Gor'kov (Russian: Лев Петро́вич Горько́в; 14 June 1929 – 28 December 2016) was a Russian-American research physicist known for his pioneering work in the field of superconductivity. His largest contribution to the field was developing the microscopic foundations of the Ginzburg–Landau theory of superconductivity. Gor'kov was a professor of physics at Florida State University in Tallahassee, Florida, and a program director in Condensed Matter at the National High Magnetic Field Laboratory. He was one of the Magnet Lab's founding scientists.

== Biography ==
Gor'kov was born in Moscow and received his academic training when he was at Moscow State University, after which he entered Kapitza Institute for Physical Problems, and eventually joined the Landau Institute for Theoretical Physics.

In 1966, he was awarded the Lenin Prize, Russia's highest award for scientific achievement, in recognition of his groundbreaking work on superconductivity. In 1981, he received the Bardeen Prize (with Alexei Abrikosov and Vitaly Ginzburg). In 1988, he received the Landau Prize, the highest award in Russia for theoretical physics.

In 1992, less than a year after the collapse of the Soviet Union, he left Moscow for the United States at age 63.

In 2004, he was a co-recipient of the prestigious Eugene Feenberg Award, given to recognize researchers who have advanced the field of many-body physics. In 2005, he became an elected member of the National Academy of Sciences, one of the very highest honors that can be bestowed on any U.S. scientist or engineer.

He belonged to the last generation of scientists who were direct disciples of Soviet theorist Lev Landau. Gor’kov's contributions to physics reflect the unique style of the Landau Institute.

In addition to his duties at the Magnet Lab, Gor'kov maintained his RAS membership and continued to perform research for the Landau Institute.

In 2015, he was awarded the prestigious Ugo Fano Gold Medal of the Rome International Center for Materials Science Superstripes RICMASS for his key prediction of two electronics components in cuprate high temperature superconductors.

Gor'kov died on 28 December 2016 at the age of 87. On June 24–26, 2019, The Landau Institute for Theoretical Physics hosted an International Conference in his honor.
