= Reptation Monte Carlo =

Reptation Monte Carlo is a quantum Monte Carlo method.

It is similar to Diffusion Monte Carlo, except that it works with paths rather than points. This has some advantages relating to calculating certain properties of the system under study that diffusion Monte Carlo has difficulty with.

In both diffusion Monte Carlo and reptation Monte Carlo, the method first aims to solve the time-dependent Schrödinger equation in the imaginary time direction. When you propagate the Schrödinger equation in time, you get the dynamics of the system under study. When you propagate it in imaginary time, you get a system that tends towards the ground state of the system.

When substituting $it$ in place of $t$, the Schrodinger equation becomes identical with a diffusion equation. Diffusion equations can be solved by imagining a huge population of particles (sometimes called "walkers"), each diffusing in a way that solves the original equation. This is how diffusion Monte Carlo works.

Reptation Monte Carlo works in a very similar way, but is focused on the paths that the walkers take, rather than the density of walkers.

In particular, a path may be mutated using a Metropolis algorithm which tries a change (normally at one end of the path) and then accepts or rejects the change based on a probability calculation.

The update step in diffusion Monte Carlo would be moving the walkers slightly, and then duplicating and removing some of them. By contrast, the update step in reptation Monte Carlo mutates a path, and then accepts or rejects the mutation.
