= Path integral molecular dynamics =

Molecular dynamics simulations augmented with quantum mechanics

Path integral molecular dynamics (PIMD) is a method of incorporating quantum mechanics into molecular dynamics simulations using Feynman path integrals. In PIMD, one uses the Born–Oppenheimer approximation to separate the wavefunction into a nuclear part and an electronic part. The nuclei are treated quantum mechanically by mapping each quantum nucleus onto a classical system of several fictitious particles connected by springs (harmonic potentials) governed by an effective Hamiltonian, which is derived from Feynman's path integral. The resulting classical system, although complex, can be solved relatively quickly. There are now a number of commonly used condensed matter computer simulation techniques that make use of the path integral formulation including centroid molecular dynamics (CMD), ring polymer molecular dynamics (RPMD), and the Feynman–Kleinert quasi-classical Wigner (FK–QCW) method (named after Richard Feynman and Hagen Kleinert). The same techniques are also used in path integral Monte Carlo (PIMC).

There are two ways to calculate the dynamics calculations of PIMD. The first one is the non-Hamiltonian phase space analysis theory, which has been updated to create an "extended system" of isokinetic equations of motion which overcomes the properties of a system that created issues within the community. The second way is by using Nosé–Hoover chain, which is a chain of variables instead of a single thermostat of variable.

== Ring-polymer representation of the partition function ==
Consider a single distinguishable particle of mass $m$ moving in one dimension, with Hamiltonian

$$\hat H=\hat T+\hat V
=\frac{\hat p^2}{2m}+V(\hat q).$$

Its canonical partition function is

$$Q=\operatorname{Tr}\left(e^{-\beta\hat H}\right),
\qquad
\beta=\frac{1}{k_{\mathrm B}T}.$$

The Boltzmann operator can be divided into $n$ imaginary-time slices,

$$e^{-\beta\hat H}
=\left(e^{-\beta_n\hat H}\right)^n,
\qquad
\beta_n=\frac{\beta}{n}.$$

Inserting complete sets of position eigenstates between the factors gives

$$Q=
\int \mathrm dq_1\cdots\int\mathrm dq_n
\prod_{j=1}^{n}
\left\langle q_j\left|
e^{-\beta_n\hat H}
\right|q_{j+1}\right\rangle ,
\qquad q_{n+1}=q_1.$$

The condition $q_{n+1}=q_1$ follows from the trace and makes the discretized path cyclic. For sufficiently large $n$, the symmetric Suzuki–Trotter factorization gives

$$e^{-\beta_n(\hat T+\hat V)}
=
e^{-\beta_n\hat V/2}
e^{-\beta_n\hat T}
e^{-\beta_n\hat V/2}
+\mathcal O(\beta_n^3).$$

The free-particle imaginary-time propagator is obtained by inserting momentum eigenstates:

$$\begin{aligned}
\left\langle q\left|
e^{-\beta_n\hat T}
\right|q'\right\rangle
&=
\frac{1}{2\pi\hbar}
\int_{-\infty}^{\infty}\mathrm dp\,
\exp\left[
-\frac{\beta_n p^2}{2m}
+\frac{ip(q-q')}{\hbar}
\right] \\[4pt]
&=
\sqrt{\frac{m}{2\pi\beta_n\hbar^2}}\,
\exp\left[
-\frac{m(q-q')^2}{2\beta_n\hbar^2}
\right].
\end{aligned}$$

Defining the ring-polymer frequency

$$\omega_n=\frac{1}{\beta_n\hbar}
=\frac{n}{\beta\hbar},$$

the short-time density matrix becomes

$$\left\langle q\left|
e^{-\beta_n\hat H}
\right|q'\right\rangle
\simeq
\sqrt{\frac{m}{2\pi\beta_n\hbar^2}}\,
\exp\left\{
-\beta_n\left[
\frac{1}{2}m\omega_n^2(q-q')^2
+\frac{V(q)+V(q')}{2}
\right]
\right\}.$$

A set of auxiliary momenta can be introduced using the Gaussian identity

$$\sqrt{\frac{m}{2\pi\beta_n\hbar^2}}\,
e^{-\beta_n m\omega_n^2(q-q')^2/2}
=
\frac{1}{2\pi\hbar}
\int_{-\infty}^{\infty}\mathrm dp\,
e^{-\beta_n[p^2/(2m)+m\omega_n^2(q-q')^2/2]}.$$

Applying this identity to every imaginary-time slice gives

$$Q=\lim_{n\to\infty}Q_n,$$

where

$$Q_n=
\frac{1}{(2\pi\hbar)^n}
\int\mathrm d\boldsymbol p\,
\int\mathrm d\boldsymbol q\,
e^{-\beta_n H_n(\boldsymbol p,\boldsymbol q)}$$

and

$$H_n(\boldsymbol p,\boldsymbol q)
=
\sum_{j=1}^{n}
\left[
\frac{p_j^2}{2m}
+\frac{1}{2}m\omega_n^2(q_j-q_{j+1})^2
+V(q_j)
\right],
\qquad q_{n+1}=q_1.$$

Thus the quantum canonical partition function is mapped onto the classical partition function of a cyclic polymer containing $n$ beads. Adjacent beads are connected by harmonic springs of frequency $\omega_n$, and each bead experiences the physical potential $V$. The variables $p_j$ are auxiliary sampling momenta and should not be identified with measurements of the quantum momentum. Path integral molecular dynamics samples this ring-polymer distribution using classical molecular-dynamics trajectories.

For the symmetric factorization above, the leading finite-$n$ discretization error scales as $\mathcal O(n^{-2})$, subject to the usual regularity conditions on the potential.

== Equilibrium estimators and molecular-dynamics sampling ==
The ring-polymer construction establishes a classical isomorphism for equilibrium statistical mechanics: the quantum system at inverse temperature $\beta$ is represented by a classical ring polymer whose phase-space weight contains $\beta_n=\beta/n$. Although the auxiliary ring polymer is sampled with the factor $e^{-\beta_nH_n}$, the physical temperature remains $1/(k_{\mathrm B}\beta)$; its dependence is contained in both $\beta_n$ and the spring frequency $\omega_n=n/(\beta\hbar)$.

For an observable represented by an operator $\hat A$, the canonical quantum expectation value is

$$\langle\hat A\rangle
=
\frac{1}{Q}
\operatorname{Tr}\left(
e^{-\beta\hat H}\hat A
\right).$$

If the observable depends only on position, $\hat A=A(\hat q)$, its ring-polymer representation is

$$\langle\hat A\rangle
=
\lim_{n\rightarrow\infty}
\frac{1}{(2\pi\hbar)^nQ_n}
\int\mathrm d\boldsymbol p
\int\mathrm d\boldsymbol q\,
e^{-\beta_nH_n(\boldsymbol p,\boldsymbol q)}
A_n(\boldsymbol q),$$

where

$$A_n(\boldsymbol q)
=
\frac{1}{n}\sum_{j=1}^{n}A(q_j)$$

is the bead-averaged estimator. Thus the observable is first averaged over the beads and then over the canonical distribution of the ring polymer.

=== Path integral molecular dynamics ===
Path integral molecular dynamics uses fictitious classical dynamics to sample the ring-polymer canonical distribution. If the sampling dynamics are ergodic and preserve this distribution, the phase-space ensemble average may be evaluated as a long-time average along a trajectory.

Writing the ring-polymer Hamiltonian as

$$H_n(\boldsymbol p,\boldsymbol q)
=
\sum_{j=1}^{n}\frac{p_j^2}{2m}
+U_n(\boldsymbol q),$$

where

$$U_n(\boldsymbol q)
=
\sum_{j=1}^{n}
\left[
\frac{1}{2}m\omega_n^2(q_j-q_{j+1})^2
+V(q_j)
\right],
\qquad q_{n+1}=q_1,$$

the corresponding Hamilton equations are

$$\dot{\boldsymbol q}
=
\frac{\partial H_n}{\partial\boldsymbol p}
=
\frac{\boldsymbol p}{m},
\qquad
\dot{\boldsymbol p}
=
-\frac{\partial H_n}{\partial\boldsymbol q}
=
-\frac{\partial U_n}{\partial\boldsymbol q}.$$

Unthermostatted Hamiltonian dynamics conserves $H_n$ and therefore samples a microcanonical rather than a canonical distribution. In addition, energy exchange between weakly coupled ring-polymer modes can be inefficient, and unthermostatted PIMD can be nonergodic for some systems.

=== Normal-mode representation ===
Efficient PIMD algorithms frequently transform the free ring polymer into its normal modes. For an even number of beads, relabeled as $j=0,\ldots,n-1$, a real orthogonal transformation is

$$P_k=\sum_{j=0}^{n-1}C_{jk}p_j,
\qquad
Q_k=\sum_{j=0}^{n-1}C_{jk}q_j,$$

where

$$C_{jk}
=
\begin{cases}
\sqrt{1/n},
& k=0,\\[4pt]
\sqrt{2/n}\cos(2\pi jk/n),
& 1\leq k\leq n/2-1,\\[4pt]
\sqrt{1/n}(-1)^j,
& k=n/2,\\[4pt]
\sqrt{2/n}\sin(2\pi jk/n),
& n/2+1\leq k\leq n-1.
\end{cases}$$

In these coordinates, the free ring-polymer Hamiltonian is diagonal:

$$H_n^{(0)}(\boldsymbol P,\boldsymbol Q)
=
\sum_{k=0}^{n-1}
\left[
\frac{P_k^2}{2m}
+\frac{1}{2}m\omega_k^2Q_k^2
\right],$$

with normal-mode frequencies

$$\omega_k
=
2\omega_n\sin\left(\frac{k\pi}{n}\right).$$

The mode $k=0$ has zero spring frequency and corresponds to the ring-polymer centroid,

$$Q_0=\frac{1}{\sqrt n}\sum_{j=0}^{n-1}q_j.$$

=== PILE thermostat ===
The path integral Langevin equation (PILE) thermostat applies a frequency-dependent Langevin thermostat to the ring-polymer normal modes. Including the physical potential, the continuous-time equations can be written as

$$\dot Q_k=\frac{P_k}{m},$$

$$\dot P_k
=
-m\omega_k^2Q_k
-\frac{\partial V_n}{\partial Q_k}
-\gamma_kP_k
+\sqrt{\frac{2m\gamma_k}{\beta_n}}\,\xi_k(t),$$

where

$$V_n(\boldsymbol Q)
=
\sum_{j=0}^{n-1}V(q_j(\boldsymbol Q))$$

and the independent Gaussian white noises satisfy

$$\langle\xi_k(t)\rangle=0,
\qquad
\langle\xi_k(t)\xi_{k'}(t')\rangle
=
\delta_{kk'}\delta(t-t').$$

For the internal modes, the PILE choice that minimizes the autocorrelation time of the free ring-polymer energy is

$$\gamma_k=2\omega_k,
\qquad k>0.$$

Since $\omega_0=0$, this prescription does not thermostat the centroid. In the local version, PILE-L, the centroid is assigned an independent friction coefficient

$$\gamma_0=\frac{1}{\tau_0},$$

where $\tau_0$ is a user-selected thermostat time scale. In the global version, PILE-G, the centroid is instead coupled to a global stochastic velocity-rescaling thermostat. The stochastic velocity-rescaling method generates the canonical distribution by rescaling all selected momenta with a common random factor.

=== Relation to real-time dynamics ===
The ring-polymer isomorphism is an equilibrium statistical-mechanical relation. The fictitious trajectories used in PIMD are therefore sampling trajectories and are not, in general, the exact real-time quantum dynamics of the original system. Configurational equilibrium averages are unchanged by a consistent choice of positive fictitious masses for the ring-polymer beads.

Ring-polymer molecular dynamics (RPMD) makes an additional dynamical approximation. It assigns the physical particle masses to the ring-polymer beads and propagates the ring-polymer Hamiltonian dynamics without a thermostat in order to approximate Kubo-transformed quantum time-correlation functions.

== Combination with other simulation techniques ==
The simulations done my PIMD can broadly characterize the biomolecular systems, covering the entire structure and organization of the membrane, including the permeability, protein-lipid interactions, along with "lipid-drug interactions, protein–ligand interactions, and protein structure and dynamics."

== Applications ==
PIMD is "widely used to describe nuclear quantum effects in chemistry and physics".

Path Integral Molecular Dynamics can be applied to polymer physics, both field theories, quantum and not, string theory, stochastic dynamics, quantum mechanics, and quantum gravity. PIMD can also be used to calculate time correlation functions
