= Paolo Budinich =

Italian physicist

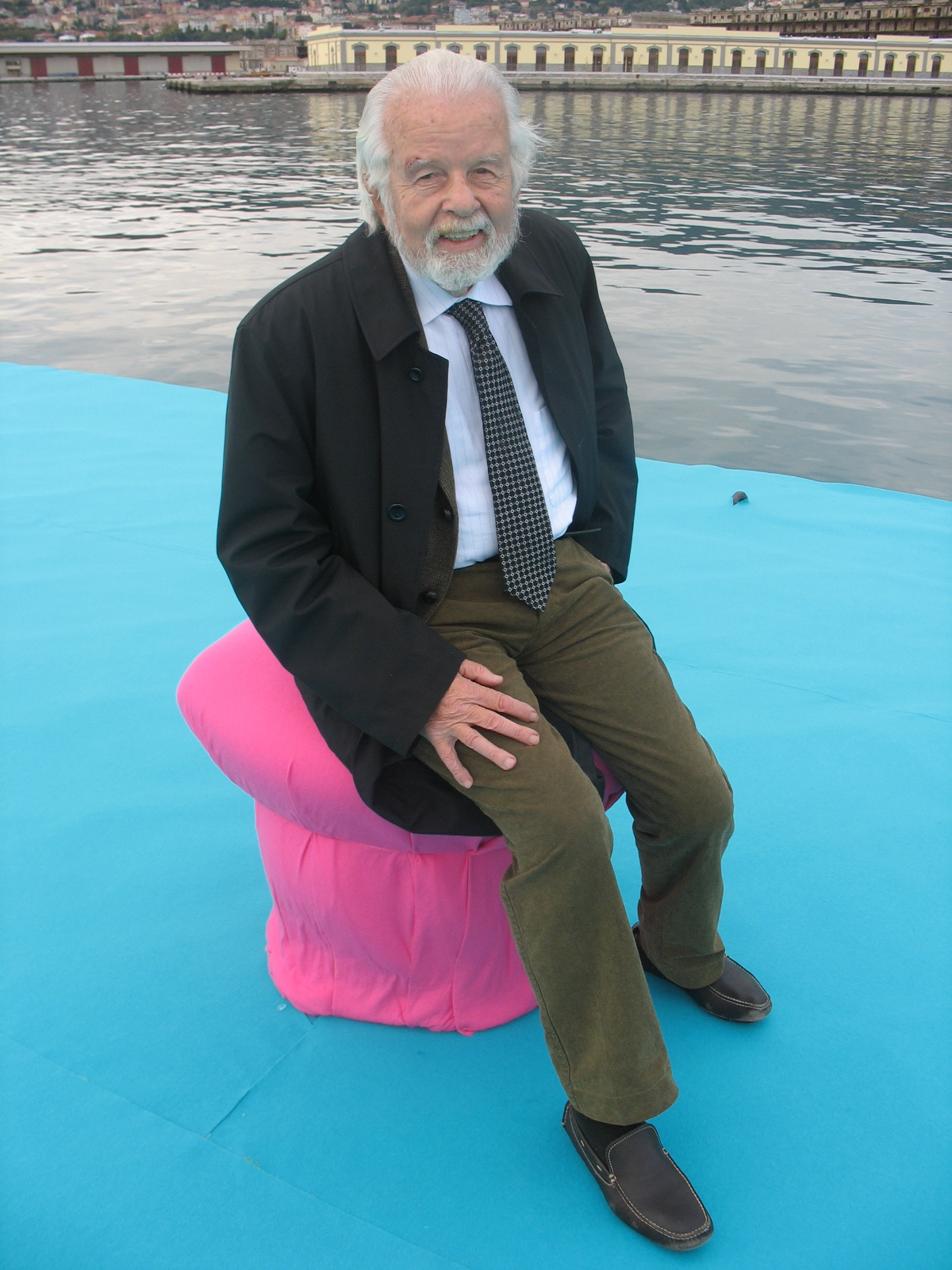
- Paolo Budinich in Trieste, 2007
- Born: 28 August 1916; Lussingrande, Austro-Hungarian empire
- Died: 14 November 2013 (aged 97); Trieste, Italy
- Education: University of Pisa; Scuola Normale Superiore di Pisa
- Scientific career
- Fields: Theoretical physics
- Workplaces: International Centre for Theoretical Physics; International School for Advanced Studies
- Doctoral advisor: Leonida Tonelli

Paolo Budinich (28 August 1916 – 14 November 2013) was an Italian theoretical physicist.

== Biography ==
Born in Veli Lošinj (Italian: Lussingrande) to a family of sailors, he grew up and studied in Trieste, where the family resided and his father Antonio Budini (Note: In 1937, during Italian fascism, the family name was Italianised to “Budini”; it was restored to the original spelling in 1977.) taught in the local high school, which Paolo attended until 1934. He later began his studies at Università Degli Studi di Pisa graduating from the Scuola Normale Superiore in 1938, with a thesis written under the direction of Leonida Tonelli.

In the same year he started to teach physics on the Italian training ship Amerigo Vespucci, belonging to the Italian Naval Academy of Leghorn.

During the Second World War Budinich served as a Lieutenant on Navy submarines and an observer on Navy planes; in 1941 he was captured by the Royal Navy and became a prisoner of war, thus being transferred to England and then to the United States.

Returning to physics, in 1952 he worked with Werner Heisenberg in Göttingen and in 1954 with Wolfgang Pauli in Zürich.

He was one of the first promoters of Trieste as a science resort at international level. In 1964 he founded in the city, together with Abdus Salam, the International Centre for Theoretical Physics (ICTP). In the same year he promoted the Advanced School of Physics, which in 1978 was upgraded to the International School for Advanced Studies (SISSA), the first Italian higher education institution providing doctoral degrees (besides the Scuola Normale Superiore in Pisa), and became its first director.

In his autobiography L'arcipelago delle meraviglie, published in 2000, Budinich pleads for a reunification between science and philosophy and suggests the superior capability of mathematics to explore unknown paths of scientific discovery. His main work, The Spinorial Chessboard, written together with the Polish mathematical physicist Andrzej Trautman, refers to Élie Cartan's conceptual foundation of spinor geometry and explores its applications to modern physics.

== Bibliography ==
- Paolo Budinich, L'arcipelago delle meraviglie, Beit casa editrice, Trieste 2016, ISBN 978-88-95324-50-0.
- Paolo Budinich and Andrzej Trautman, The Spinorial Chessboard, Springer Verlag, Berlin-New York 1988, ISBN 9783540190783.
