= Path integral Monte Carlo =

Quantum algorithm to calculate path integrals in quantum multi-body problems

Path integral Monte Carlo (PIMC) is a quantum Monte Carlo method used to solve quantum statistical mechanics problems numerically within the path integral formulation. The application of Monte Carlo methods to path integral simulations of condensed matter systems was first pursued in a key paper by John A. Barker.

The method is typically (but not necessarily) applied under the assumption that symmetry or antisymmetry under exchange can be neglected, i.e., identical particles are assumed to be quantum Boltzmann particles, as opposed to fermion and boson particles. The method is often applied to calculate thermodynamic properties such as the internal energy, heat capacity, or free energy. As with all Monte Carlo method based approaches, a large number of points must be calculated.

In principle, as more path descriptors are used (these can be "replicas", "beads," or "Fourier coefficients," depending on what strategy is used to represent the paths), the more quantum (and the less classical) the result is. However, for some properties the correction may cause model predictions to initially become less accurate than neglecting them if a small number of path descriptors are included. At some point the number of descriptors is sufficiently large and the corrected model begins to converge smoothly to the correct quantum answer. Because it is a statistical sampling method, PIMC can take anharmonicity fully into account, and because it is quantum, it takes into account important quantum effects such as tunneling and zero-point energy (while neglecting the exchange interaction in some cases).

The basic framework was originally formulated within the canonical ensemble, but has since been extended to include the grand canonical ensemble and the microcanonical ensemble. Its use has been extended to fermion systems as well as systems of bosons.

An early application was to the study of liquid helium. Numerous applications have been made to other systems, including liquid water and the hydrated electron. The algorithms and formalism have also been mapped onto non-quantum mechanical problems in the field of financial modeling, including option pricing.

== See also ==
- Path integral molecular dynamics
- Quantum algorithm
