= ANVUR =

Italian governmental agency

ANVUR logo

ANVUR (Agenzia Nazionale di Valutazione del Sistema Universitario e della Ricerca) is the Italian National Agency for the Evaluation of the University and Research Systems. ANVUR was established by a 2006 law with the objective of improving meritocracy in Italian academic research. It was based on Aeres in France and the Research Excellence Framework (REF) in the United Kingdom.

ANVUR began to compile its assessment of Italian research, the "VQR" (eValuation of the Quality of Research) in November 2011, assessing 95 universities, 21 research agencies or institutes, and 17 inter-university consortia.

With the entry into office of the Berlusconi IV government, and of the new Minister of Education, University and Research Mariastella Gelmini, the different political orientations regarding the evaluation of the university system and research materialized in the request by the Minister of an amendment to the Agency's Regulations, on which, moreover, the not full satisfaction of an observation by the State Council regarding the definition of the functional organization of the offices was also pending. Having set up a commission of experts and having made some changes, albeit not extensive, to the text, the Minister proposed the adoption of the new Regulation in a preliminary version on 24 July 2009. Following the observations of the Council of State and the parliamentary committees, it was then definitively modified on 17 December 2009. After the signature of the presidential decree on 1 February 2010 and the registration of the Court of Auditors on 13 May (with two points of exclusion), publication in the Official Gazette it arrived on May 27; the implementation operations of the Agency, in particular the appointment of the members of the Board of Directors, could therefore have started from its entry into force, on 11 June 2010.
