= Eugene Feenberg =

American physicist (1906–1977)

- Born: October 6, 1906; Fort Smith, Arkansas
- Died: November 7, 1977 (aged 71)
- Education: UT-Austin (BS); Harvard University (PhD)
- Awards: Elected to National Academy of Sciences
- Scientific career
- Fields: quantum mechanics nuclear physics
- Workplaces: Institute for Advanced Study; New York University; Washington University in St. Louis
- Thesis: Scattering of slow electrons by neutral atoms (1933)
- Doctoral advisor: Edwin C. Kemble
- Doctoral students: Mark Bolsterli; Woo Chia-wei; John Walter Clark; Walter E. Massey; Fa-Yueh Wu

Eugene Feenberg (October 6, 1906 in Fort Smith, Arkansas – November 7, 1977) was an American physicist who made contributions to quantum mechanics and nuclear physics.

== Education ==
In 1929, Feenberg graduated from the University of Texas at Austin in three years, first in his class; he majored in physics and mathematics. Upon the urging of one of his professors, C. P. Boner, Feenberg then went to Harvard University to study with Edwin C. Kemble for a doctorate in physics. While at Harvard, during 1930 and 1931, he also worked part-time at a Raytheon laboratory, as the Great Depression was in full swing. In 1931, Harvard awarded him a Parker Traveling Fellowship; he left for Europe in the fall of that year. During his stay in Europe, he studied with Arnold Sommerfeld at the Ludwig-Maximilians-Universität München, Wolfgang Pauli at ETH Zurich, and Enrico Fermi at the University of Rome.

Adolf Hitler had been appointed Chancellor in January 1933 and Feenberg was in Leipzig in the spring of that year. He wrote to Kemble of the persecution taking place and the violence in the streets. Harvard called Feenberg back to the Harvard campus, where he finished his doctorate under Kemble in 1933. His thesis was on quantum scattering of slow electrons by neutral atoms. For the next two years at Harvard, he was an instructor and worked on the theory of nuclear forces and structure. During this time at Harvard, he also contributed to advancing quantum theory, as Kemble, in the original 1937 edition of his book on the subject, thanked his former colleague Feenberg, along with others for suggestions and assistance.

== Career ==
In 1935, Feenberg went to the University of Wisconsin–Madison for a year, where he continued his work on nuclear structure and energy levels. In 1936, he collaborated with Gregory Breit and published a paper on the charge independence of nuclear forces. There he met Eugene Wigner, and they collaborated on work which resulted in a paper published in 1937 on the structure of nuclei from helium to oxygen, showing the importance of the symmetry of the wave function in binding p-shell nuclei.

From 1936 to 1938, Feenberg was at the Institute for Advanced Study in Princeton, New Jersey. There he continued his work on the nuclear p-shell, some of it in collaboration with Melba Phillips; their work was published in 1937.

On recommendations from Wigner, Kemble, and Isidor Isaac Rabi, New York University hired Feenberg for its Washington Square College, where he would eventually rise to the rank of associate professor. During World War II, while he was sought to work at Los Alamos, he took a leave of absence to work on radar at the Sperry Corporation where he advanced the theory of klystron tubes.

After the war, in 1946, Feenberg was hired by Arts and Sciences at Washington University in St. Louis as associate professor, eventually rising to full professor. There, he drew on his studies of isomerism and nuclear structure and the nature of Beta decay transitions to provide the foundations for building a modern shell theory of the nucleus. This work resulted in his second book published in 1955. His first book had been published two years earlier, 1953, with George Pake, who had just become head of the physics department the year before at age 28. His third book, on quantum fluids, was published in 1967, and his collected papers were published in 1975. Feenberg became the Wayman Crow Professor of Physics in 1964, a position he held until becoming professor emeritus in 1975.

While at Washington University, Feenberg was Visiting Higgins Professor of Physics at Princeton University (1953–1954), visiting professor of physics at Stony Brook University (spring semester 1969), and lecturer at Escuela Latino Americana de Fisica, Universidad Nacional Autonoma de Mexico (July 1–19, 1974).

Feenberg died on November 7, 1977.

== Honors ==
- 1975 – Elected to the National Academy of Sciences

== Selected literature ==
- Gregory Breit and Eugene Feenberg. The possibility of the same form of specific interaction for all nuclear particles, Phys. Rev. 50 850 (1936) doi:10.1103/PhysRev.50.850
- Eugene P. Wigner and Eugene Feenberg. On the structure of the nuclei between helium and oxygen, Phys. Rev. 51 95 (1937) doi:10.1103/PhysRev.51.95
- Melba Phillips and Eugene Feenberg. On the structure of light nuclei, Phys. Rev. 51 597 (1937) doi:10.1103/PhysRev.51.597
- Eugene P. Wigner and Eugene Feenberg. Symmetry properties of nuclear levels, Rep. Prog. Phys. 8 274 (1942) doi:10.1088/0034-4885/8/1/313 Bibcode:1941RPPh....8..274W

== Books ==
- Eugene Feenberg and George Edward Pake. Notes on the Quantum Theory of Angular Momentum (Addison-Wesley, 1953 and 1958) (Stanford University Press, Reissued 1959) (Dover, 1999)
- Eugene Feenberg. Shell Theory of the Nucleus (Princeton University, 1955)
- Eugene Feenberg. Theory of Quantum Fluids (Academic Press, 1967 and 1969)
- Eugene Feenberg. Collected Publications of Eugene Feenberg (1975)
