= Quantum Monte Carlo =

Probabilistic algorithms to simulate quantum many-body systems

Quantum Monte Carlo encompasses a large family of computational methods whose common aim is the study of complex quantum systems. One of the major goals of these approaches is to provide a reliable solution (or an accurate approximation) of the quantum many-body problem. The diverse flavors of quantum Monte Carlo approaches all share the common use of the Monte Carlo method to handle the multi-dimensional integrals that arise in the different formulations of the many-body problem.

Quantum Monte Carlo methods allow for a direct treatment and description of complex many-body effects encoded in the wave function, going beyond mean-field theory. In particular, there exist numerically exact and polynomially-scaling algorithms to exactly study static properties of boson systems without geometrical frustration. For fermions, there exist very good approximations to their static properties and numerically exact exponentially scaling quantum Monte Carlo algorithms, but none that are both.

== Background ==
In principle, any physical system can be described by the many-body Schrödinger equation as long as the constituent particles are not moving "too" fast; that is, they are not moving at a speed comparable to that of light, and relativistic effects can be neglected. This is true for a wide range of electronic problems in condensed matter physics, in Bose–Einstein condensates and superfluids such as liquid helium. The ability to solve the Schrödinger equation for a given system allows prediction of its behavior, with important applications ranging from materials science to complex biological systems.

The difficulty is however that solving the Schrödinger equation requires the knowledge of the many-body wave function in the many-body Hilbert space, which typically has an exponentially large size in the number of particles. Its solution for a reasonably large number of particles is therefore typically impossible, even for modern parallel computing technology in a reasonable amount of time. Traditionally, approximations for the many-body wave function as an antisymmetric function of one-body orbitals have been used, in order to have a manageable treatment of the Schrödinger equation. However, this kind of formulation has several drawbacks, either limiting the effect of quantum many-body correlations, as in the case of the Hartree–Fock (HF) approximation, or converging very slowly, as in configuration interaction applications in quantum chemistry.

Quantum Monte Carlo is a way to directly study the many-body problem and the many-body wave function beyond these approximations. The most advanced quantum Monte Carlo approaches provide an exact solution to the many-body problem for non-frustrated interacting boson systems, while providing an approximate description of interacting fermion systems. Most methods aim at computing the ground state wavefunction of the system, with the exception of path integral Monte Carlo and finite-temperature auxiliary-field Monte Carlo, which calculate the density matrix. In addition to static properties, the time-dependent Schrödinger equation can also be solved, albeit only approximately, restricting the functional form of the time-evolved wave function, as done in the time-dependent variational Monte Carlo.

From a probabilistic point of view, the computation of the top eigenvalues and the corresponding ground state eigenfunctions associated with the Schrödinger equation relies on the numerical solving of Feynman–Kac path integration problems.

== Quantum Monte Carlo methods ==
There are several quantum Monte Carlo methods, each of which uses Monte Carlo in different ways to solve the many-body problem.

=== Zero-temperature (only ground state) ===
- Variational Monte Carlo: A good place to start; it is commonly used in many sorts of quantum problems.
  - Diffusion Monte Carlo: The most common high-accuracy method for electrons (that is, chemical problems), since it comes quite close to the exact ground-state energy fairly efficiently. Also used for simulating the quantum behavior of atoms, etc.
  - Reptation Monte Carlo: Recent zero-temperature method related to path integral Monte Carlo, with applications similar to diffusion Monte Carlo but with some different tradeoffs.
- Gaussian quantum Monte Carlo
- Path integral ground state: Mainly used for boson systems; for those it allows calculation of physical observables exactly, i.e. with arbitrary accuracy

=== Finite-temperature (thermodynamic) ===
- Auxiliary-field Monte Carlo: Usually applied to lattice problems, although there has been recent work on applying it to electrons in chemical systems.
- Continuous-time quantum Monte Carlo
- Determinant quantum Monte Carlo or Hirsch–Fye quantum Monte Carlo
- Hybrid quantum Monte Carlo
- Path integral Monte Carlo: Finite-temperature technique mostly applied to bosons where temperature is very important, especially superfluid helium.
- Stochastic Green function algorithm: An algorithm designed for bosons that can simulate any complicated lattice Hamiltonian that does not have a sign problem.
- World-line quantum Monte Carlo
- Stochastic series expansion, a method which avoids the discretization error associated with path integral Monte Carlo by approximating the Taylor series expansion of the partition function using Monte Carlo sampling.

=== Real-time dynamics (closed quantum systems) ===
- Time-dependent variational Monte Carlo: An extension of the variational Monte Carlo to study the dynamics of pure quantum states.

== See also ==
- Monte Carlo method
- QMC@Home
- Quantum chemistry
- Quantum Markov chain
- Density matrix renormalization group
- Time-evolving block decimation
- Metropolis–Hastings algorithm
- Wavefunction optimization
- Monte Carlo molecular modeling
- Quantum chemistry computer programs
- Numerical analytic continuation
