= Quantum chemistry =

Chemistry based on quantum physics

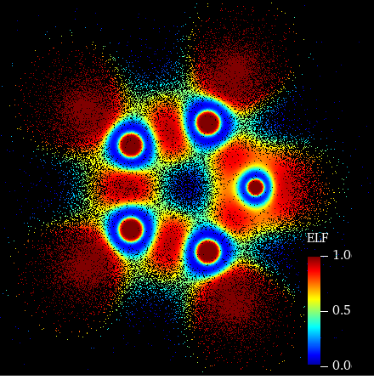
Simulated electron localization function (ELF) map of a furan (C_{4}H_{4}O) molecule. Colour indicates the magnitude of the ELF field, which reflects the degree of electron localisation at each point in the molecular plane.

Quantum chemistry, or molecular quantum mechanics, is a branch of physical chemistry which applies quantum mechanics to chemical systems to predict physical and chemical properties of molecules and materials. It often involves calculating electronic wave functions at the atomic level. These calculations make approximations to make simulations computationally feasible while capturing the relevant contributions to the computed wave functions and observable properties including the structures, spectra, and thermodynamics of a system. Quantum chemistry also covers the computation of quantum effects on molecular dynamics and chemical kinetics.

The field developed between the 1910s and 1930s. G. N. Lewis's 1916 model of valence electrons gave an early framework. Walter Heitler and Fritz London's 1927 calculation for the hydrogen molecule, the first quantum-mechanical treatment of a chemical bond, is often seen as the first milestone, though some date the field's birth to the Schrödinger equation's use on the hydrogen atom. Two approaches followed. Valence bond theory was developed by John Slater and Linus Pauling in the 1930s, and Pauling's 1939 textbook introduced it to many chemists. Molecular orbital theory was developed by Friedrich Hund and Robert Mulliken in 1929 and underlies Hartree–Fock and later methods. The 1927 Thomas–Fermi model led to density functional theory.

Quantum chemistry studies focus on the electronic ground state and excited states of atoms, molecules, and ions. Such calculations allow chemical reactions to be described with respect to pathways, intermediates, and transition states. Spectroscopic properties may also be predicted. Typically, such studies assume the electronic wave function is adiabatically parameterized by the nuclear positions (i.e., the Born–Oppenheimer approximation). A wide variety of approaches are used, including semi-empirical methods, density functional theory, Hartree–Fock calculations, quantum Monte Carlo methods, and coupled cluster methods.

Understanding electronic structure and molecular dynamics through the development of computational solutions to the Schrödinger equation is a central goal of quantum chemistry. Progress in the field depends on overcoming several challenges, including the need to increase the accuracy of the results for small molecular systems, as well as to increase the size of large molecules that can be realistically subjected to computation, which is limited by scaling considerations—the computation time increases as a power of the number of atoms.

== History ==
A 1927 article by Walter Heitler (1904–1981) and Fritz London (1900–1954) is often recognized as the first milestone in the history of quantum chemistry. This was the first application of quantum mechanics to the diatomic hydrogen molecule, and thus to the phenomenon of the chemical bond.

Prior to this, a critical conceptual framework was provided by Gilbert N. Lewis in his 1916 paper The Atom and the Molecule, wherein Lewis developed the first working model of valence electrons. Irving Langmuir extended Lewis's model in 1919, introducing the terms octet and covalence. Important contributions were also made by Yoshikatsu Sugiura and S.C. Wang. A series of articles by Linus Pauling, written throughout the 1930s, integrated the work of Heitler, London, Sugiura, Wang, Lewis, and John C. Slater on the concept of valence and its quantum-mechanical basis into a new theoretical framework. Many chemists were introduced to the field of quantum chemistry by Pauling's 1940 text The Nature of the Chemical Bond and the Structure of Molecules and Crystals: An Introduction to Modern Structural Chemistry, wherein he summarized this work (referred to widely now as valence bond theory) and explained quantum mechanics in a way which could be followed by chemists. The work soon became a standard text at many universities. In 1937, Hans Hellmann appears to have been the first to publish a book on quantum chemistry, in the Russian and German languages.

In the years to follow, this theoretical basis slowly began to be applied to chemical structure, reactivity, and bonding. In addition to the investigators mentioned above, important progress and critical contributions were made in the early years of this field by Robert S. Mulliken, Max Born, J. Robert Oppenheimer, Hans Hellmann, Maria Goeppert Mayer, Erich Hückel, Douglas Hartree, John Lennard-Jones, and Vladimir Fock.

== Electronic structure ==
The electronic structure of an atom or molecule is the quantum state of its electrons. The first step in solving a quantum chemical problem is usually solving the Schrödinger equation (or Dirac equation in relativistic quantum chemistry) with the electronic molecular Hamiltonian, usually making use of the Born–Oppenheimer (B–O) approximation. This is called determining the electronic structure of the molecule. An exact solution for the non-relativistic Schrödinger equation can only be obtained for the hydrogen atom (though exact solutions for the bound state energies of the hydrogen molecular ion within the B–O approximation have been identified in terms of the generalized Lambert W function). Since all other atomic and molecular systems involve the motions of three or more "particles", their Schrödinger equations cannot be solved analytically and so approximate and/or computational solutions must be sought. The process of seeking computational solutions to these problems is part of the field known as computational chemistry.

=== Valence bond theory ===
As mentioned above, Heitler and London's method was extended by Slater and Pauling to become the valence-bond (VB) method. In this method, attention is primarily devoted to the pairwise interactions between atoms, and this method therefore correlates closely with classical chemists' drawings of bonds. It focuses on how the atomic orbitals of an atom combine to give individual chemical bonds when a molecule is formed, incorporating the two key concepts of orbital hybridization and resonance.

A covalent bond is formed when there is an overlap of half-filled atomic orbitals from two atoms, which together form an electron pair. The strength and energy of the system is dependent on the amount of overlap. As the atoms move together, their orbitals start to overlap and the electrons begin to feel the attraction of both nuclei. There is also a repulsion that begins to occur, which becomes very strong when the atoms are too close together. The ideal and most stable length between the two atoms is the bond distance, which is when the repulsive and attractive forces balance resulting in the lowest energy configuration.

Orientation of the orbitals can greatly affect which bonds are formed, if any. When there is a direct overlap of one atomic orbital from each atom, a sigma (σ) bond is formed. This can be created from two s-orbitals, an s-orbital and a p-orbital, or two p-orbitals. A pi (π) bond is formed from a side-to-side overlap of two p-orbitals. The pi bond only forms if the phases of the overlapping p-orbitals are the same.

=== Molecular orbital theory ===
MO diagram of the trihydrogen cation

An alternative approach to valence bond (VB) theory was developed in 1929 by Friedrich Hund and Robert S. Mulliken, in which electrons are described by mathematical functions delocalized over an entire molecule. The Hund–Mulliken approach or molecular orbital (MO) method is less intuitive to chemists but predicts spectroscopic properties better than the VB method. As opposed to VB theory, MO theory does not focus just the overlap of electron density in one area causing a bond but instead describes the whole molecule as one system. This leads to a more complex understanding of the system. This approach is the conceptual basis of the Hartree–Fock method and further post-Hartree–Fock methods.

MO calculations result in orbitals or wavefunctions and energies for a molecule, which can be filled with electrons from two different atomic orbitals. These atomic orbitals come from separate atoms, resulting in molecular orbitals being linear combinations of atomic orbitals.

=== Density functional theory ===
The Thomas–Fermi model was developed independently by Thomas and Fermi in 1927. This was the first attempt to describe many-electron systems on the basis of electronic density instead of wave functions, although it was not very successful in the treatment of entire molecules. The method did provide the basis for what is now known as density functional theory (DFT). Modern day DFT uses the Kohn–Sham method, where the density functional is split into four terms: the Kohn–Sham kinetic energy, an external potential, the system's Hartree energy, and the exchange–correlation energy. A large part of the focus on developing DFT is on improving the exchange and correlation terms. Though this method is less developed than post Hartree–Fock methods, it can be applied to larger polyatomic molecules and even macromolecules due to its significantly lower computational requirements (scaling typically no worse than n^{3} with respect to n basis functions, for the pure functionals). This computational affordability, and often comparable accuracy to MP2 and CCSD(T) (post-Hartree–Fock methods), has made it one of the most popular methods in computational chemistry.

== Chemical dynamics ==
A further step can consist of solving the Schrödinger equation with the total molecular Hamiltonian in order to study the motion of molecules. Direct solution of the Schrödinger equation is called quantum dynamics, whereas its solution within the semiclassical approximation is called semiclassical dynamics. Purely classical simulations of molecular motion are referred to as molecular dynamics. Another approach to dynamics is a hybrid framework known as mixed quantum-classical dynamics. Yet another hybrid framework is path integral molecular dynamics, which uses the Feynman path integral formulation to add quantum corrections to molecular dynamics. Statistical approaches, using for example classical and quantum Monte Carlo methods, are also possible and are particularly useful for describing equilibrium distributions of states.

=== Adiabatic chemical dynamics ===
In adiabatic dynamics, interatomic interactions are represented by single scalar potentials called potential energy surfaces. This is the Born–Oppenheimer approximation introduced by Born and Oppenheimer in 1927. Pioneering applications of this in chemistry were performed by Rice and Ramsperger in 1927 and Kassel in 1928, and generalized into the RRKM theory in 1952 by Marcus who took into account the transition state theory developed by Eyring in 1935. These methods enable simple estimates of unimolecular reaction rates from a few characteristics of the potential surface.

=== Non-adiabatic chemical dynamics ===
Non-adiabatic dynamics consists of taking the interaction between several coupled potential energy surfaces (corresponding to different electronic quantum states of the molecule). The coupling terms are called vibronic couplings. The pioneering work in this field was done by Stueckelberg, Landau, and Zener in the 1930s, in their work on what is now known as the Landau–Zener transition. Their formula enables the calculation of the transition probability between two adiabatic potential curves in the neighborhood of an avoided crossing. Spin-forbidden reactions are one type of non-adiabatic reactions where at least one change in spin state occurs when progressing from reactant to product.

== See also ==
- Atomic physics – Field of physics that studies the atom
- Computational chemistry – Branch of chemistry
- Condensed matter physics – Branch of physics
- Car–Parrinello molecular dynamics – Computational chemistry software package
- Electron localization function – Method of measuring the extent of spatial localization of an electron
- International Academy of Quantum Molecular Science – Organization devoted to applying quantum physics to chemistry
- Molecular modelling – Discovering chemical properties by physical simulations
- Physical chemistry – Physics applied to chemical systems
- Quantum computational chemistry – Computer simulation of chemical systems
- List of quantum chemistry and solid-state physics software
- QMC@Home – BOINC based volunteer computing project
- Quantum Aspects of Life
- Quantum electrochemistry
- Relativistic quantum chemistry – Theories of quantum chemistry explained via relativistic mechanics
- Theoretical physics – Branch of physics
- Spin forbidden reactions

== Sources ==
- Atkins, P.W. (2002). Physical Chemistry. Oxford University Press. ISBN 0-19-879285-9.
- Atkins, P.W.; Friedman, R. (2005). Molecular Quantum Mechanics (4th ed.). Oxford University Press. ISBN 978-0-19-927498-7.
- Atkins, P.W.; Friedman, R. (2008). Quanta, Matter and Change: A Molecular Approach to Physical Change. Macmillan. ISBN 978-0-7167-6117-4.
- Bader, Richard (1994). Atoms in Molecules: A Quantum Theory. Oxford University Press. ISBN 978-0-19-855865-1.
- Cramer, Christopher J (2004). Essentials of Computational Chemistry : Theories and Models (2 ed.). Wiley. ISBN 9780470091821. OCLC 55887497.
- Dral, Pavlo O. (2023). Dral, Pavlo O. (ed.). Quantum Chemistry in the Age of Machine Learning. Amsterdam, Netherlands: Elsevier. ISBN 9780323900492. LCCN 2024443666. OCLC 1294286017.
- Gavroglu, Kostas; Simões, Ana (2011). Neither Physics nor Chemistry: A History of Quantum Chemistry. MIT Press. ISBN 978-0-262-01618-6.
- Karplus, M.; Porter, R. N. (1971). Atoms and Molecules: An Introduction for Students of Physical Chemistry. Benjamin–Cummings Publishing Company. ISBN 978-0-8053-5218-4.
- Landau, L.D.; Lifshitz, E.M. (1977). Quantum Mechanics:Non-relativistic Theory. Course of Theoretical Physic. Vol. 3. Pergamon Press. ISBN 0-08-019012-X.
- Levine, I. (2008). Physical Chemistry (6th ed.). McGraw–Hill Science. ISBN 978-0-07-253862-5.
- Coulson, Charles Alfred (1991) [1979]. McWeeny, Roy (ed.). Coulson's valence (3 ed.). Oxford University Press. ISBN 9780198551454. OCLC 468330825.
- Pauling, L. (1954). General Chemistry. Dover Publications. ISBN 0-486-65622-5.
- Pauling, L.; Wilson, E. B. (1963) [1935]. Introduction to Quantum Mechanics with Applications to Chemistry. Dover Publications. ISBN 0-486-64871-0.
- Pullman, Bernard; Pullman, Alberte (1963). Quantum Biochemistry. New York and London: Academic Press. ISBN 90-277-1830-X.
- Scerri, Eric R. (2006). The Periodic Table: Its Story and Its Significance. Oxford University Press. ISBN 0-19-530573-6. Considers the extent to which chemistry and especially the periodic system has been reduced to quantum mechanics.
- Simon, Z. (1976). Quantum Biochemistry and Specific Interactions. Taylor & Francis. ISBN 978-0-85626-087-2.
- Szabo, Attila; Ostlund, Neil S. (1996). Modern Quantum Chemistry: Introduction to Advanced Electronic Structure Theory. Dover. ISBN 0-486-69186-1.
