= Many-body problem =

Problem in physics and quantum mechanics

The quantum many-body problem is a general name for a vast category of physical problems pertaining to deriving the behavior of multi-particle systems using fundamental quantum-mechanical principles.

The goal of many-body physics is to find new principles to describe macroscopic systems, using principles that pertain to microscopic systems.

== Terminology ==
Many can be anywhere from three to infinity, although three- and four-body systems can be treated by specific means (respectively the Faddeev and Faddeev–Yakubovsky equations) and are thus sometimes separately classified as few-body systems.

Body, in this case, is referring to a particle (electron, nuclei, atom, etc.).

== Explanation ==
All information about a system can be extracted from its wave function. Solving Schrödinger's equation allows you to find the wave function associated with a system, and therefore determine the properties of it. Schrödinger's equation can only be solved exactly for the hydrogen atom or simpler systems; anything more complex than this can only be solved through approximation methods. This is because when the amount of particles in a system increases, repulsive interactions between electrons occur, and the term in Schrödinger's equation that corresponds to the energy of these repulsions is impossible to solve for.

This arising complexity becomes especially clear by a comparison to classical mechanics. Imagine a single particle that can be described with $k$ numbers (take for example a free particle described by its position and velocity vector, resulting in $k=6$). In classical mechanics, $n$ such particles can simply be described by $k\cdot n$ numbers. The dimension of the classical many-body system scales linearly with the number of particles, $n$.

In quantum mechanics, however, the dimension of the many-body wave function scales exponentially with $n$, much faster than in classical mechanics.

Because the required numerical expense grows so quickly, simulating the dynamics of more than three quantum-mechanical particles is already infeasible for many physical systems. Thus, many-body physics most often relies on a set of approximation methods, such as the variational method and perturbation theory, specific to the problem at hand. It ranks among the most computationally intensive fields of science.

Many-body problems play a central role in condensed matter physics.

== Examples ==
- Condensed matter physics (solid-state physics, nanoscience, superconductivity)
- Bose–Einstein condensation and Superfluids
- Quantum chemistry (computational chemistry, molecular physics)
- Atomic physics
- Molecular physics
- Nuclear physics (Nuclear structure, nuclear reactions, nuclear matter)
- Quantum chromodynamics (Lattice QCD, hadron spectroscopy, QCD matter, quark–gluon plasma)

== Approaches ==
- Mean-field theory and extensions (e.g. Hartree–Fock, Random phase approximation)
- Dynamical mean field theory
- Many-body perturbation theory and Green's function-based methods
- Configuration interaction
- Coupled cluster
- Various Monte-Carlo approaches
- Density functional theory
- Lattice gauge theory
- Matrix product state
- Neural network quantum states
- Numerical renormalization group
