= Thermal quantum field theory =

Quantum field theory at non-zero temperatures

In theoretical physics, thermal quantum field theory (thermal field theory for short) or finite temperature field theory is a set of methods to calculate expectation values of physical observables of a quantum field theory at finite temperature.

There are three main formalisms used to describe finite-temperature states:

- Matsubara formalism, based on evolving the system in imaginary time.
- Schwinger–Keldysh formalism, based on the real-time evolution, allowing the treatment of non-equilibrium processes.
- Umezawa formalism (thermo field dynamics), which is based on real-time evolution, and introduces a doubled Hilbert space to represent thermal states.

== Matsubara formalism ==
In the Matsubara formalism, after Takeo Matsubara, the basic idea (due to Felix Bloch), is that the expectation values of operators in a canonical ensemble

$$\langle A\rangle=\frac{\mbox{Tr}\, [\exp(-\beta H) A]}{\mbox{Tr}\, [\exp(-\beta H)]}$$

may be written as expectation values in ordinary quantum field theory where the configuration is evolved by an imaginary time $\tau = i t(0\leq\tau\leq\beta)$. One can therefore switch to a spacetime with Euclidean signature, where the above trace (Tr) leads to the requirement that all bosonic and fermionic fields be periodic and antiperiodic, respectively, with respect to the Euclidean time direction with periodicity $\beta = 1/(kT)$ (we are assuming natural units $\hbar = 1$). This allows one to perform calculations with the same tools as in ordinary quantum field theory, such as functional integrals and Feynman diagrams, but with compact Euclidean time. Note that the definition of normal ordering has to be altered.

In momentum space, this leads to the replacement of continuous frequencies by discrete imaginary (Matsubara) frequencies $v_n = n / \beta$ and, through the de Broglie relation, to a discretized thermal energy spectrum $E_n = 2 n \pi k T$. This has been shown to be a useful tool in studying the behavior of quantum field theories at finite temperature.

It has been generalized to theories with gauge invariance and was a central tool in the study of a conjectured deconfining phase transition of Yang–Mills theory. In this Euclidean field theory, real-time observables can be retrieved by analytic continuation. The Feynman rules for gauge theories in the Euclidean time formalism, were derived by C. W. Bernard.

An alternative approach which is of interest to mathematical physics is to work with KMS states.

== Schwinger–Keldysh formalism ==
A path-ordered approach to real-time formalism includes the Schwinger–Keldysh formalism (by Julian Schwinger and Leonid Keldysh) and more modern variants. It involves replacing a straight time contour from (large negative) real initial time $t_i$ to $t_i - i\beta$ by one that first runs to (large positive) real time $t_f$ and then suitably back to $t_i - i\beta$. In fact all that is needed is one section running along the real time axis, as the route to the end point, $t_i - i\beta$, is less important. The piecewise composition of the resulting complex time contour leads to a doubling of fields and more complicated Feynman rules, but obviates the need of analytic continuations of the imaginary-time formalism.

As well as Feynman diagrams and perturbation theory, other techniques such as dispersion relations and the finite temperature analog of Cutkosky rules can also be used in the real time formulation.

== Umezawa formalism ==
The alternative approach by Hiroomi Umezawa to real-time formalisms is an operator based approach using Bogoliubov transformations, known as Umezawa formalism or thermo field dynamics.

== See also ==
- Matsubara summation
- Polyakov loop
- Quantum thermodynamics
- Quantum statistical mechanics
