= James K. Freericks =

American physicist and author

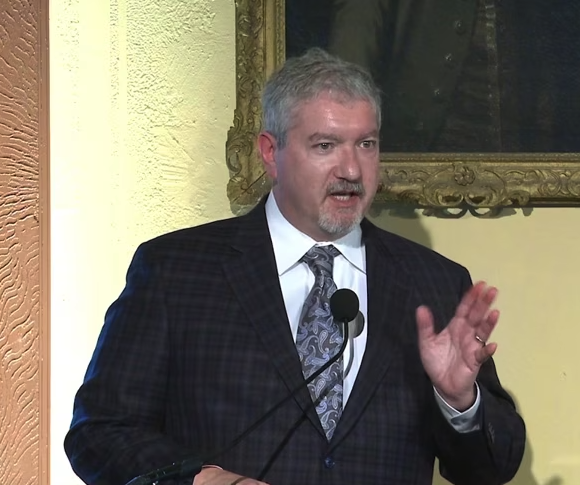
- Born: 1963 (age 62–63); Paramus, New Jersey, U.S.
- Education: Princeton University (undergraduate), the University of California at Berkeley (PhD), Institute for Theoretical Physics/University of California at Santa Barbara (postdoc), the University of California at Davis (postdoc)
- Awards: Kusaka memorial prize in physics Alpha Sigma Nu, 2009 national book award
- Scientific career
- Workplaces: Georgetown University, Department of Physics
- Doctoral advisor: Leo Falicov
- Website: http://site.physics.georgetown.edu/~jkf

James K. Freericks (born 1963) is an American physicist who holds the McDevitt chair in physics at Georgetown University. He has worked in fields of condensed matter physics, mathematical physics, atomic physics, nonequilibrium physics, quantum computation, and quantum mechanics pedagogy. His massive open online course (MOOC) "Quantum Mechanics for Everyone" was ranked #3 in the world by Class Central in 2024.

== Early life and education ==
He was born in Paramus, New Jersey, to parents Mary and Charles Freericks. He attended Spring Valley Elementary School, Memorial Elementary School, East Brook Middle School and Paramus High School, graduating in 1981. He was influenced by his uncle, Peter Avakian, a research physicist at DuPont, to enter the field of physics.

In 1981 he entered Princeton University as a physics major, graduating in 1985. His senior thesis, Time Reversal-Invariance Tests in Muon Capture, explored whether one can use muon capture in spin-polarized muonic hydrogen to examine time reversal invariance violation (equivalent to CP violation); he was advised by physicists Frank Calaprice and Sam Treiman. He also worked at the Thomas J. Watson Research Center (IBM Yorktown) as a summer student on their neutrino mass experiment, examining weak-interaction contributions to beta decay and how accurately the retarding grid will measure the final-state energy. He graduated from Princeton summa cum laude, was elected to Phi Beta Kappa, and won the Kusaka Memorial prize in physics. At the University of California, Berkeley, he initially started as a string theorist, but changed to work in condensed matter physics with Leo Falicov. His 1991 dissertation was focused on small-cluster exact diagonalization studies, examining magnetism and symmetry properties. He was a National Science Foundation graduate fellowship awardee and a two-time Department of Education fellowship awardee. He then went to the Institute for Theoretical Physics in Santa Barbara (1991–93) as a postdoctoral fellow working with physicist Douglas Scalapino. It is there that he started working in dynamical mean-field theory and began a long-standing collaboration with Mark Jarrell, then at the University of Cincinnati. His second postdoctoral fellowship was at the University of California, Davis (1993–94), working with Richard Scalettar.

== Work as a physicist ==
He arrived at Georgetown University in 1994 as an assistant professor, promoted to associate professor in 1998, and full professor in 2002. He was made the inaugural Robert L. McDevitt, K.S.G., K.C.H.S and Catherine H. McDevitt, L.C.H.S. Chair in physics in 2010. He was awarded the Oak Ridge Associated Universities Junior Faculty Enhancement Award (1995) and the Office of Naval Research Young Investigator Award in 1996. He is a Fellow of the American Physical Society (2006), having served as the treasurer and secretary of the Division of Computational Physics from 2012 to 2017. He was the Councillor for the Division of Computational Physics and the Topical Group on Big Data from 2020 to 2023. He is currently the treasurer of the American Association of Physics Teachers and is the section representative of its Chesapeake section. He became a fellow of the American Association for the Advancement of Science in 2018. He was named a Slater lecturer at the University of Florida in 2019. He has served on the editorial boards of the Nature journal Scientific Reports, Symmetry and the American Journal of Physics.

His early research focused on small cluster calculations for strongly correlated materials. He then moved into the electron-phonon problem, examining vertex corrections. He has worked on two projects with mathematical physicist Elliott Lieb of Princeton, and other mathematical physics problems. He was one of the pioneers in dynamical mean-field theory, working primarily on transport and other response functions. His first book, Transport in Multilayered Nanostructures: The Dynamical Mean-Field Theory Approach, won the 2009 Alpha Sigma Nu best book prize for physical science. He generalized dynamical mean-field theory into nonequilibrium, and focused on examining pump-probe experiments. He was part of the DARPA optical lattice emulator program, which initiated his work with ion trap simulators, including the first simulation in a Penning trap with hundreds of qubits. More recently, he focused on working on how quantum computing can be used to simulate real science problems (including a damped-driven simulation of 1000 Trotter steps) and how to re-envision how quantum mechanics is taught.

== MOOC, Quantum Mechanics for Everyone ==
In 2017, he released the MOOC Quantum Mechanics for Everyone. He teaches the ideas behind superposition, measurement, entanglement, complementarity, and tagging (a reversible way to create entangled states). The class is based on the ideas of theoretical physicists Richard Feynman and Daniel Styer, and requires no more advanced math or physics than what is covered at the high school level. It was a finalist for the 2018 edX award. It is ranked number 3 in the top 250 MOOCs of all time by class central. Freericks has taught over 60,000 students through the MOOC. He has two other MOOCs---one on mathematical methods and one on quantum mechanics—both college-level courses closely paralleling his offerings at Georgetown University. He teaches them annually, and the math methods course was a finalist for the 2023 edX award for innovation in online teaching.

== Book, Quantum Mechanics Done Right ==
After the first cohort of students took the MOOC "Quantum Mechanics for Everyone," there was demand for more materials. From a physics colleague, Wes Mathews, Freericks learned about the Schroedinger factorization method and how quantum mechanics can be taught with a more algebraic focus rather than a differential equation approach. His book Quantum Mechanics Done Right: The Shortest Path from Novice to Researcher, appeared July 21, 2026. The electronic version is open-access, and free to download here. Freericks focuses on conceptual ideas and quantum reasoning first (as discussed in the first four modules of his MOOC), before developing conventional topics in quantum mechanics using unconventional methods. Freericks developed these materials with undergraduates, high school students, and citizen scientists, publishing multiple papers on these topics for the book.
