= Matsubara (disambiguation) =

Matsubara, Osaka is a city in Japan.

Matsubara may also refer to:

- Matsubara (surname), a Japanese surname
- Miho no Matsubara, scenic area on the Miho Peninsula in Shimizu Ward of Shizuoka City, Japan
- Matsubara frequency, in thermal quantum field theory, the summation over discrete imaginary frequency
- Sociedade Esportiva Matsubara, a Brazilian football club
- Miki Matsubara, Japanese composer, lyricist, and singer (1959-2004)

== See also ==
- Matsubara Station (disambiguation)
