= Numerical analytic continuation =

In many-body physics, the problem of analytic continuation is that of numerically extracting the spectral density of a Green function given its values on the imaginary axis. It is a necessary post-processing step for calculating dynamical properties of physical systems from Quantum Monte Carlo simulations, which often compute Green function values only at imaginary times or Matsubara frequencies.

Mathematically, the problem reduces to solving a Fredholm integral equation of the first kind with an ill-conditioned kernel. As a result, it is an ill-posed inverse problem with no unique solution and where a small noise on the input leads to large errors in the unregularized solution. There are different methods for solving this problem including the maximum entropy method, the average spectrum method and Pade approximation methods.

== Examples ==
A common analytic continuation problem is obtaining the spectral function $A(\omega)$ at real frequencies $\omega$ from the Green function values $\mathcal{G}(i\omega_n)$ at Matsubara frequencies $\omega_n$ by numerically inverting the integral equation

$\mathcal{G}(i\omega_n) = \int_{-\infty}^{\infty} \frac{d\omega}{2\pi} \frac{1}{i\omega_n - \omega}\; A(\omega)$

where $\omega_n = (2n+1) \pi/\beta$ for fermionic systems or $\omega_n = 2n \pi/\beta$ for bosonic ones and $\beta=1/ T$ is the inverse temperature. This relation is an example of Kramers-Kronig relation.

The spectral function can also be related to the imaginary-time Green function $\mathcal{G}(\tau)$ be applying the inverse Fourier transform to the above equation

$\mathcal{G}(\tau)\ \colon = \frac{1}{\beta}\sum_{\omega_n} e^{-i\omega_n \tau} \mathcal{g}(i\omega_n) = \int_{-\infty}^{\infty} \frac{d\omega}{2\pi} A(\omega) \frac{1}{\beta}\sum_{\omega_n} \frac{e^{-i\omega_n \tau} }{i\omega_n - \omega}$

with $\tau \in [0,\beta]$. Evaluating the summation over Matsubara frequencies gives the desired relation

$\mathcal{G}(\tau) = \int_{-\infty}^{\infty} \frac{d\omega}{2\pi} \frac{-e^{-\tau \omega}}{1\pm e^{-\beta\omega}} A(\omega)$

where the upper sign is for fermionic systems and the lower sign is for bosonic ones.

Another example of the analytic continuation is calculating the optical conductivity $\sigma(\omega)$ from the current-current correlation function values $\Pi(i\omega_n)$ at Matsubara frequencies. The two are related as following

$\Pi(i\omega_n) = \int_{0}^{\infty} \frac{d\omega}{\pi} \frac{2 \omega^2}{\omega_n^2 +\omega^2}\; A(\omega)$

== Software ==
- The Maxent Project: Open source utility for performing analytic continuation using the maximum entropy method.
- Spektra: Free online tool for performing analytic continuation using the average spectrum Method.
- SpM: Sparse modeling tool for analytic continuation of imaginary-time Green's function.

== See also ==
- Analytic continuation
- Monodromy theorem
- Fredholm integral equation
- Green's function
- Kramers–Kronig relations
- Quantum Monte Carlo
