= Exact diagonalization =

Numerical technique for solving quantum Hamiltonians

Exact diagonalization (ED) is a numerical technique used in physics to determine the eigenstates and energy eigenvalues of a quantum Hamiltonian. In this technique, a Hamiltonian for a discrete, finite system is expressed in matrix form and diagonalized using a computer. Exact diagonalization is only feasible for systems with few degrees of freedom, due to the exponential growth of the Hilbert space dimension with the size of the quantum system. It is frequently employed to study lattice models, including the Hubbard model, Ising model, Heisenberg model, t-J model, and SYK model.

== Expectation values from exact diagonalization ==
After determining the eigenstates $|n\rangle$ and energies $\epsilon_n$ of a given Hamiltonian, exact diagonalization can be used to obtain expectation values of observables. For example, if $\mathcal{O}$ is an observable, its thermal expectation value is

$$\langle \mathcal{O}\rangle = \frac{1}{Z} \sum_n e^{-\beta \epsilon_n} \langle n | \mathcal{O} | n \rangle,$$

where $Z = \sum_n e^{-\beta \epsilon_n}$ is the partition function. If the observable can be written down in the initial basis for the problem, then this sum can be evaluated after transforming to the basis of eigenstates.

Green's functions may be evaluated similarly. For example, the retarded Green's function $G^R(t) = -i \theta(t) \langle [A(t), B(0)] \rangle$ can be written

$$G^R(t) = -\frac{i \theta(t)}{Z} \sum_{n,m} \left(e^{-\beta \epsilon_n} - e^{-\beta \epsilon_m} \right) \langle n | A(0) | m \rangle \langle m | B(0) | n \rangle e^{-i(\epsilon_m - \epsilon_n)t/\hbar}.$$

Exact diagonalization can also be used to determine the time evolution of a system after a quench. Suppose the system has been prepared in an initial state $| \psi \rangle$, and then for time $t>0$ evolves under a new Hamiltonian, $\mathcal{H}$. The state at time $t$ is

$$| \psi(t) \rangle =  \sum_n e^{-i\epsilon_n t/\hbar} \langle n | \psi(0) \rangle | n \rangle.$$

== Memory requirements ==
The dimension of the Hilbert space describing a quantum system scales exponentially with system size. For example, consider a system of $N$ spins localized on fixed lattice sites. The dimension of the on-site basis is 2, because the state of each spin can be described as a superposition of spin-up and spin-down, denoted $\left|\uparrow \right\rangle$ and $\left|\downarrow \right\rangle$. The full system has dimension $2^N$, and the Hamiltonian represented as a matrix has size $2^N \times 2^N$. This implies that computation time and memory requirements scale very unfavorably in exact diagonalization. In practice, the memory requirements can be reduced by taking advantage of symmetry of the problem, imposing conservation laws, working with sparse matrices, or using other techniques to reduce the Hilbert space dimension.

Naive estimates for memory requirements in exact diagonalization of a spin-1/2 system performed on a computer. It is assumed the Hamiltonian is stored as a matrix of double-precision floating point numbers.
| Number of sites | Number of states | Hamiltonian size in memory |
|---|---|---|
| 4 | 16 | 2048 B |
| 9 | 512 | 2 MB |
| 16 | 65536 | 34 GB |
| 25 | 33554432 | 9 PB |
| 36 | 6.872e10 | 40 ZB |

== Comparison with other techniques ==
Exact diagonalization is useful for extracting exact information about finite systems. However, often small systems are studied to gain insight into infinite lattice systems. If the diagonalized system is too small, its properties will not reflect the properties of the system in the thermodynamic limit, and the simulation is said to suffer from finite size effects.

Unlike some other exact theory techniques, such as Auxiliary-field Monte Carlo, exact diagonalization obtains Green's functions directly in real time, as opposed to imaginary time. Unlike in these other techniques, exact diagonalization results do not need to be numerically analytically continued. This is an advantage, because numerical analytic continuation is an ill-posed and difficult optimization problem.

== Applications ==
- Can be used as an impurity solver for dynamical mean-field theory techniques.
- When combined with finite size scaling, estimating the ground state energy and critical exponents of the 1D transverse-field Ising model.
- Studying properties of the 2D Heisenberg model in a magnetic field, including antiferromagnetism and spin-wave velocity.
- Studying the Drude weight of the 2D Hubbard model.
- Studying out-of-time-ordered correlators (OTOCs) and scrambling in the SYK model.
- Simulating resonant x-ray spectra of strongly correlated materials.
- Simulating the nonlinear spectroscopy of quantum magnets.

== Implementations ==
Numerous software packages implementing exact diagonalization of quantum Hamiltonians exist. These include ALPS, DoQo, EdLib, edrixs, Quanty and many others.

== Generalizations ==
Exact diagonalization results from many small clusters can be combined to obtain more accurate information about systems in the thermodynamic limit using the numerical linked cluster expansion.

== See also ==
- Lanczos algorithm
