= Matsubara (surname) =

Origin
- Region of origin: Japan

Matsubara (written 松原) is a Japanese surname. Notable people with the surname include:

- Arisa Matsubara (松原 有沙; born 1995), Japanese women's footballer
- Hiroki Matsubara (松原 浩樹; born 1973), Japanese footballer
- Hisako Matsubara (松原 久子; born 1935), Japanese writer
- Jin Matsubara (松原 仁; born 1956), Japanese politician
- Ken Matsubara (松原 健; born 1993), Japanese footballer
- Kiyomatsu Matsubara (松原 喜代松; 1907–1968), Japanese marine biologist
- Kozo Matsubara (松原 光三; born 1949), Japanese handball player
- Masayuki Matsubara (松原 正之; born 1939), Japanese sport wrestler
- Miki Matsubara (松原 みき; 1959–2004), Japanese singer-songwriter and composer
- Matsubara Naoko (松原 直子; born 1937), Japanese artist
- Osamu Matsubara (松原 治; died 2012), Japanese businessman
- Rie Matsubara (松原 梨恵; born 1993), Japanese rhythmic gymnast
- Takehisa Matsubara (松原 武久; born 1937), Japanese politician
- Takeo Matsubara (松原 武生; 1921-2014), Japanese physicist
- Tsuyoshi Matsubara (松原 剛志; born 1979), Japanese singer and actor
- Yoshika Matsubara (松原 良香; born 1974), Japanese footballer
- Yuki Matsubara (松原 優吉; born 1988), Japanese footballer
