= Roser Maria Valentí =

Spanish-Catalan physicist

Maria Roser Valentí (born 1963) is a Spanish-Catalonian professor of theoretical condensed matter physics at Johann Wolfgang Goethe-Universität Frankfurt am Main.

== Biography ==
In 1987, Valentí graduated from the University of Barcelona with honors. In 1989, she finished her doctoral thesis in theoretical condensed matter physics with distinction at the University of Barcelona. After her dissertation was completed, she was named a Fulbright-Fellow allowing her to study at the University of Florida.

== Scientific interests ==
Within theoretical condensed matter physics, Valentí has contributed to the understanding of superconductivity, frustrated magnetism, and topological isolators. In her group, exact diagonalization, single particle Green's Functions and machine learning techniques are employed. During the COVID-19 pandemic Valentí also published research assessing the efficiency of certain mitigation strategies like social distancing. She is a member of several scientific councils.

== Fellowships and awards ==
- Fellow of the American Physical Society
- Michael und Biserka Baum Preis
- Fulbright Fellowship
- Speaker of the national research initiative "Elastic Tuning and Responses of Electronic Quantum Phases of Matter" (ELASTO-Q-MAT)
- Speaker of the international research initiative "Quantitative Spatio-Temporal Model-Building for Correlated Electronic Matter" (QUAST - for 5249)
- Member of the DFG Fachkollegium of condensed matter physics
- Editor Board of the Journal Physical Review B

== Selected publications ==
- Stephen M. Winter, Kira Riedl, David Kaib, Radu Coldea, Roser Valentí, Probing RuCl3 Beyond Magnetic Order: Effects of Temperature and Magnetic Field, Physical Review Letters 120, 077203 (2018)
- Stephen M. Winter, Kira Riedl, Pavel A. Maksimov, Alexander L. Chernyshev, Andreas Honecker, Roser Valentí, Breakdown of Magnons in a Strongly Spin-Orbital Coupled Magnet, Nature Communications 8, 1152 (2017)
- Daniel Guterding, Sandra Diehl, Michaela Altmeyer, Torsten Methfessel, Ulrich Tutsch, Harald Schubert, Michael Lang, Jens Müller, Michael Huth, Harald O. Jeschke, Roser Valentí, Martin Jourdan, Hans-Joachim Elmers, Evidence for eight node mixed-symmetry superconductivity in a correlated organic metal, Physical Review Letters 116, 237001 (2016)
