= 松原 =

松原 may refer to:

- Songyuan
- Matsubara (disambiguation)
