= Victoria Herrmann =

American polar geographer and climate change communicator

- Born: Paramus, New Jersey
- Education: University of Cambridge (Ph.D) Norman Paterson School of International Affairs (M.A.) Lehigh University (B.A.)

Victoria Herrmann is an American polar geographer and climate change communicator. She is the managing director of The Arctic Institute, a National Geographic Explorer, and Assistant Research Professor at Georgetown University’s Walsh School of Foreign Service, where her research focuses on Arctic cooperation and politics and climate change adaptation in the US and US Territories.

Herrmann is also an American Association for the Advancement of Science (AAAS) IF/THEN Ambassador and works to empower girls and women in STEM. She has been named on Forbes 30 Under 30 list, the National Trust for Historic Preservation’s 40 under 40 list, a North American Young Leader by Friends of Europe, one of 100 Most Influential People in Climate Policy worldwide by Apolitical, and as part of the inaugural "CAFE 100 – extraordinary change-makers who are taking action to address some of the most pressing problems in America and around the world" by former US Attorney Preet Bharara.

== Life and education ==
Born in Paramus, New Jersey, Herrmann took an early interest in environmental issues. She was raised Jewish and has cited her grandparents’ experience as Holocaust survivors as the inspiration of her research and advocacy on the impacts of climate change on disenfranchised communities. She attended Paramus High School.

In 2012 she completed a B.A. in International Relations and Art History at Lehigh University and was subsequently awarded a one-year Junior Fellowship at the Carnegie Endowment for International Peace in Washington, DC, where she worked on sustainable transport and climate policy in cities. Herrmann moved to Canada in 2013 as a Fulbrightgrantee, completing an M.A. in International Affairs at Carleton University’s Norman Paterson School of International Affairs. In 2014 she was awarded a Gates Cambridge Scholarship for doctoral studies at the Scott Polar Research Institute. In 2017 Herrmann was awarded the Bill Gates Sr. Award for a commitment to improving the lives of others, and in 2019 received her PhD from the University of Cambridge. In the last year of her PhD, Herrmann spent three months at the National Academies of Sciences, Engineering, and Medicine as a fellow in The Christine Mirzayan Science and Technology Policy Fellowship program.

== Arctic policy and migration research ==
Herrmann joined The Arctic Institute in 2015, and in 2016 became the organization's President and managing director. She directs strategic planning to achieve its mission to inform policy for a just, sustainable, and secure Arctic. Herrmann oversees the implementation of global research partnerships and manages a team across North America and Europe. Under Herrmann's tenure, The Arctic Institute has consistently ranked as a top-75 think tank by the University of Pennsylvania’s Think Tanks and Civil Societies Program and was shortlisted by Prospect Magazine as the best US Energy and Environment Think Tank.

She is a recognized expert in Arctic policy, and has testified before the U.S. House of Representatives Homeland Security Committee and has briefed the U.S. House of Representatives Foreign Affairs Committee and the U.S. Senate Committee on Energy and Natural Resources on Arctic security and climate change. In 2017-2018 she served as the Alaska Review Editor for the fourth National Climate Assessment and currently serves as one of two US Delegates to the Social and Human Working Group of the International Arctic Science Committee. Herrmann has sat on the Board of Directors of the Arctic Research Consortium of the U.S. since 2019 and currently serves as a co-chair of the Arctic Youth Network Board of Directors.

Herrmann's research focuses on climate-induced migration, displacement, and relocation in the Arctic, South Pacific, and United States. In 2016–2017, she served as the lead researcher for America's Eroding Edges project, a National Geographic-funded research project. She traveled across the country interviewing 350 local leaders to identify what's needed most to safeguard coastal communities against the unavoidable impacts of climate change. In partnership with the National Trust for Historic Preservation and with support from a JMK Innovation Prize, a follow-up project to Eroding Edges is bringing technical assistance directly to small and medium-sized towns that are geographically remote and socioeconomically vulnerable. Her current National Geographic-funded research project, Culture On The Move: Climate Change, Displacement, and Relocation in Fiji, investigates the consequences of climate-induced relation on cultural heritage.

She was the inaugural Principal Investigator of the Research Coordination Network Arctic Migration in Harmony: An Interdisciplinary Network on Littoral Species, Settlements, and Cultures on the Move funded by a National Science Foundation. Herrmann developed the 700+ member international network to facilitate open communication, foster cross-disciplinary exchange, and build new collaboration teams of scientists, stakeholders, and practitioners to investigate the ways in which the drivers and consequences of Arctic coastal migrations intersect and interact with one another and identify the implications for society.

== Climate change communication ==
Herrmann works both as a science communicator for public audiences and as an academic researcher studying climate change communications. She has published more than 20 peer review journal articles and academic book chapters. Her research focuses on how images used in mass media construct values, identities, and ideas of power about climate change displacement, vulnerable communities, and Arctic policy. Herrmann has argued that climate change scholarship can and should inform concrete action, and how action can enrich scholarship. In discussing her research at universities, she has encouraged other researchers to find their public voice and weigh the importance of storytelling for encouraging climate change action.

Herrmann has given over 50 public talks, including keynote addresses at the National Trust for Historic Preservation’s PastForward, the Smithsonian Institution’s Stemming the Tide: Global Strategies for Sustaining Culture Through Climate Change, and the Hugh O’Brian Youth Leadership Foundation World Leadership Congress. Herrmann advocates that “climate change is a story about losing the things that make us who we are”, and that "everyone has a part to play in climate solutions."

As a National Geographic Explorer, Herrmann has given several public talks about climate change policy, storytelling, and community action. Her talks from National Geographic Society's stage include a Choose Your Own Adventure inspired presentation for CreativeMornings and a keynote panel at the Explorers Festival, where she was featured in conversation with Andrew Revkin, Emma Marris, Leland Melvin, and Ian Stewart to discuss a planet in peril. She has also presented for traveling National Geographic events like National Geographic On Campus. Herrmann is passionate about youth empowerment, and has worked closely with National Geographic Education to increase climate awareness and opportunities for local action. She helped produce and was featured in the online course Teaching Global Climate Change in Your Classroom, presented climate stories across America for the Explorer Classroom program, and facilitated and mentor young storytellers at National Geographic Photo Camp for youth in Louisiana. In 2021, Herrmann was a featured Explorer in ABC Owned Television Stations Our America: Climate of Hope in partnership with National Geographic Partners.

She frequently writes opinion pieces on climate change and Arctic policy for The Guardian, Scientific American, and CNN. Herrmann also appears often as an expert in the news, including NPR's Science Friday, On Point, All Things Considered, and Weekend Edition; ABC News; and the BBC, among others. In 2019 Herrmann was named an American Association for the Advancement of Science (AAAS) IF/THEN Ambassador, and is an advocate for women's visibility in climate change research and girls engaging in STEM. Herrmann has been featured as a role model for girls in STEM by the National Children's Museum the Ad Council’s She Can STEM campaign.

== Selected bibliography ==
=== Journal articles ===
- 2020 Herrmann, V. “Strategic Communications of the Arctic Council: 20 Years of Circumpolar Imaging.” Journal of Strategic Communications. https://doi.org/10.1007/s10767-020-09384-2
- 2020 Marchman, P., Siders, A.R., Leilani Main, Kelly, Herrmann, V., Butler, Debra. “Planning Relocation in Response to Climate Change: Multi-Faceted Adaptations.” Planning Theory and Practice.
- 2020 Raspotnik, A, Groenning, R., and Herrmann, V. “A Tale of Three Cities: The Concept of Smart Cities for the Arctic.” Polar Geography. Accepted.
- 2019 Herrmann, V. “The Birth of Petroleum Path Dependence: Oil Narratives and Development in the North.” American Review of Canadian Studies, 49:2, 301–331, doi:10.1080/02722011.2019.1634309
- 2019 Herrmann, V. “Rural Ruins in America’s Climate Change Story: Photojournalism, Perception, and Agency in Shishmaref, Alaska.” Annals of the American Association of Geographers, 109:3, 857–874, doi:10.1080/24694452.2018.1525272
- 2017 Herrmann, V. “Arctic Indigenous Societal Security at COP21: The Divergence of Security Discourse and Instruments in Climate Negotiations.” POLITIK, 20:3, 65–82, DOI: https://doi.org/10.7146/politik.v20i3.97174.
- 2017 Herrmann, V. “Culture on the Move: Towards an Inclusive Framework for Cultural Heritage Considerations in Climate-Related Migration, Displacement and Relocation Policies.” Archaeological Review from Cambridge, 32 (2), 182–196. DOI: https://doi.org/10.17863/CAM.23647.
- 2017 Herrmann, V. “America’s First Climate Change Refugees: Victimization and Empowerment in Journalistic Storytelling.” Energy Research and Social Science Journal, 31, 205–214. DOI: https://doi.org/10.1016/j.erss.2017.05.033.
- 2016 Herrmann, V. “Investing in Community: Conceptualizing Inclusive School Design for America’s Arctic.” Polar Geography, 39:4, 239–257, doi:10.1080/1088937X.2016.1239280
- 2016 McCorristine, S. and Herrmann, V. “The ‘Old Arctics’: Notices of Franklin Search Expedition Veterans in British Press: 1876–1934.” Polar Record, 39:4, 215-229, DOI: https://doi.org/10.1017/S0032247415000728.
- 2016 Herrmann, V. “The Cold War of Global Warming: Recycled Visual Narratives from the Top of the World.” Polar Geography, 38:4, 289–305, doi:10.1080/1088937X.2015.1117532
- 2015 Herrmann, V. “Climate Change, Arctic Aesthetics, and Indigenous Agency in the Age of the Anthropocene.” The Yearbook of Polar Law, 7:1, 375–409, DOI: https://doi.org/10.1163/2211-6427_015.
