= Claudius Gros =

German physicist

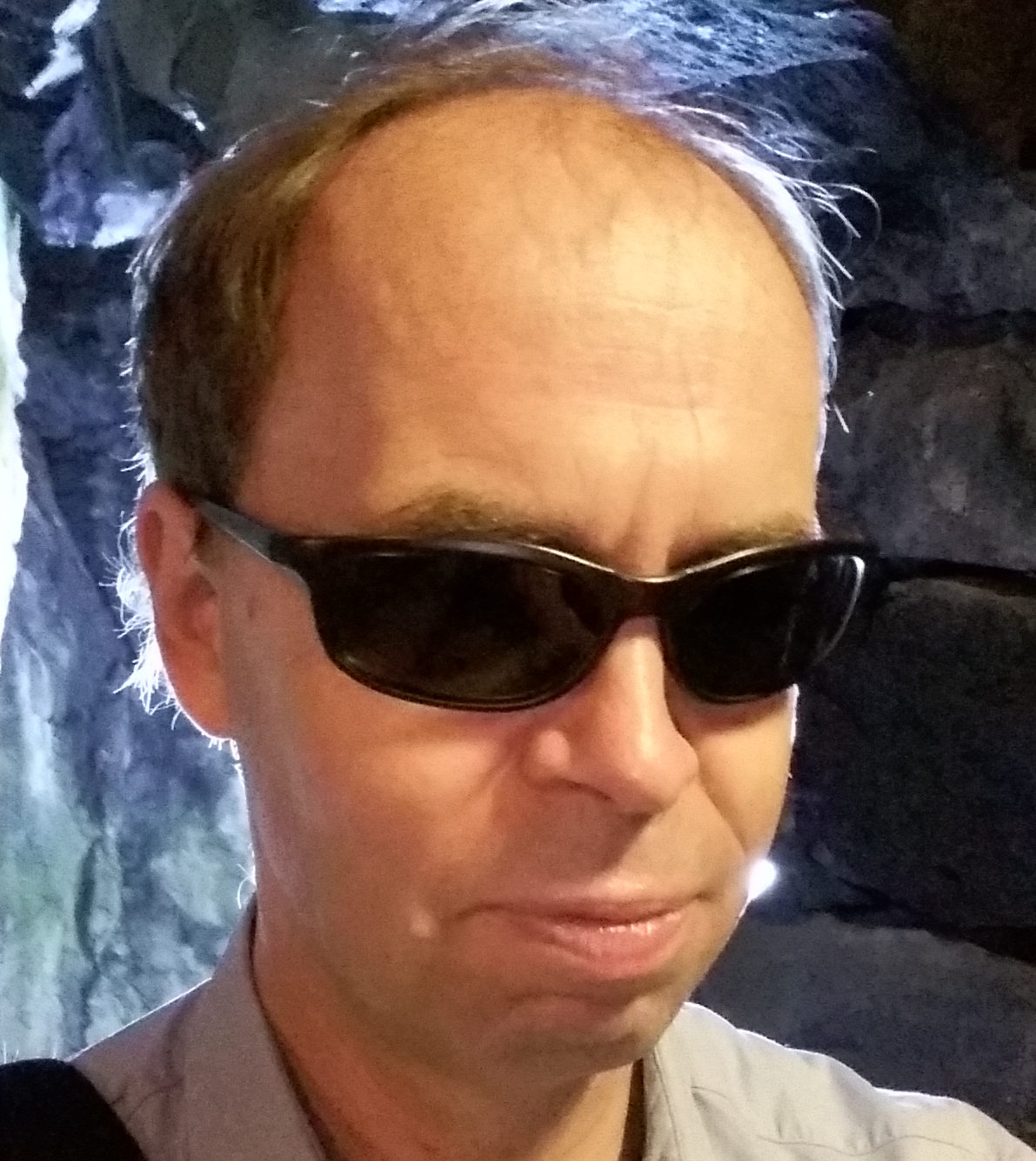
Claudius Gros 2016

Claudius Gros (born 18 February 1961 in Mainz, Germany) is a German physicist. He is a professor of theoretical physics in Goethe University Frankfurt since 2005. He specializes in computational neurosciences and complex systems theory.

== Career ==
Finishing his studies in physics 1985 at the ETH Zürich with a thesis on heavy Fermions, Gros continued for a PhD in theoretical solid-state physics. Using projected wave functions, as introduced originally by Martin Gutzwiller, he and his advisor, Thomas Maurice Rice, were able to predict d-wave superconductivity for high-temperature superconductors.

From 1988-1990, Gros worked with Steven M. Girvin and Allan H. MacDonald at the Indiana University in Bloomington, Indiana. He then spent time at Dortmund University. In 1999, he joined Saarland University as professor of theoretical physics. In 2005, he moved to Goethe University Frankfurt. Gros now works in complex systems theory, focusing on complex adaptive systems relevant to the neurosciences. His lecture course on the subject has seen four editions. In 2016, Gros published a novel. He is married to physicist Roser Valentí.

== Genesis Project ==
In 2016 Gros studied the feasibility of a low-cost interstellar mission, aiming to establish a biosphere of unicellular organisms on otherwise only transiently habitable exoplanets, fast-forwarding evolution potentially by several billion years. The long mission duration would imply, according to Gros, that the Genesis Project would not have any tangible benefit for humanity. The initial acceleration could be achieved by laser propulsion, akin to that envisioned by the Breakthrough Starshot project, with passive deceleration at the target using magnetic sails. Overall, the probe would weight about 1.5 tons and travel at 0.3 percent of the speed of light. An on-board miniaturized gene laboratory would synthesize the microbes.

The precambrian biosphere established by the Genesis probe would evolve subsequently on its own, potentially to complex lifeforms. The concept of the Genesis Project carries a series of fundamental ethical and philosophical aspects, which have been discussed in the media.
