= Kent Gilbert =

American actor in Japan (born 1952)

- Born: May 25, 1952 (age 74); Idaho, United States
- Occupation: Actor

Kent Sidney Gilbert (born May 25, 1952, in Idaho, United States) is an American commentator working in Japan, lawyer of California. He first came to Japan in 1971 as a missionary for The Church of Jesus Christ of Latter-day Saints. After returning to the United States, he received a Juris Doctor as well as an M.B.A. from Brigham Young University.

While working in Japan as an attorney in 1983, he had a chance to perform as a stand-in for a foreign theatrical company, which led to other opportunities on Japanese television and in films. He is a foreign celebrity (gaijin tarento) and is often on news programs as a commentator with a "foreign" point of view.

Gilbert lives in Tokyo and also maintains a residence in Orem, Utah. He made an appearance in Kazuki Ōmori's Godzilla vs. King Ghidorah.

Gilbert has been described as a "far-right online influencer". Gilbert maintains the Japanese government never forced women to work as prostitutes or comfort women during World War II. He was prominently featured denying the forcing of comfort women to work in a documentary film. He reportedly claimed in an interview that Koreans should be grateful that they had been colonized by Japan. In 2017, he published a book entitled "The tragedy of Chinese and Koreans who are controlled by Confucianism" where he denies Japan's Confucian traditions. The book became a best seller and led to "a new wave of hate books". He has associated himself with Toshio Motoya, a far-right figure who denies the Nanjing Massacre and the forcing of comfort women to work.

In April 2018, Gilbert was appointed visiting professor at Okayama University of Science.
