= 2018 New Jersey bus crash =

School bus crash in Mount Olive, New Jersey

- Location of Mount Olive in Morris County, New Jersey

Details
- Date: May 17, 2018; 10:18 am EST
- Location: I-80 westbound in Mount Olive, New Jersey past exit 25 for US 206
- Coordinates: 40.9074996°N 74.7269121°W
- Country: United States
- Operator: Paramus Public Schools
- Cause: Driver error; illegal U-turn

Statistics
- Bus: 1
- Vehicles: 2
- Passengers: 44
- Deaths: 2 (1 student, 1 teacher)
- Injured: 42 (approximate)

On May 17, 2018, a school bus carrying teachers and students from East Brook Middle School in Paramus, New Jersey to Waterloo Village, New Jersey crashed into a dump truck while making an illegal U-turn from Interstate 80 eastbound to westbound, in the town of Mount Olive. The driver missed the exit to Waterloo Village and attempted to illegally turn onto I-80 westbound to turn back to the exit, but crashed into a dump truck. One student and one teacher were killed, with 42 others being injured.

The bus driver, Hudy Muldrow Sr., pleaded guilty to two counts of vehicular manslaughter, 25 counts of assault by auto, and endangering the welfare of children. He also had a past history of 14 auto license suspensions since 1975. In response to the incident, governor Phil Murphy and several state senators signed two laws into effect in New Jersey ensuring safer school bus transportation and stricter punishments for suspended licenses, and representative Josh Gottheimer (NJ-5) lobbied in Congress for similar laws on the federal level.
