= Paramus High School =

High school in Bergen County, New Jersey, US

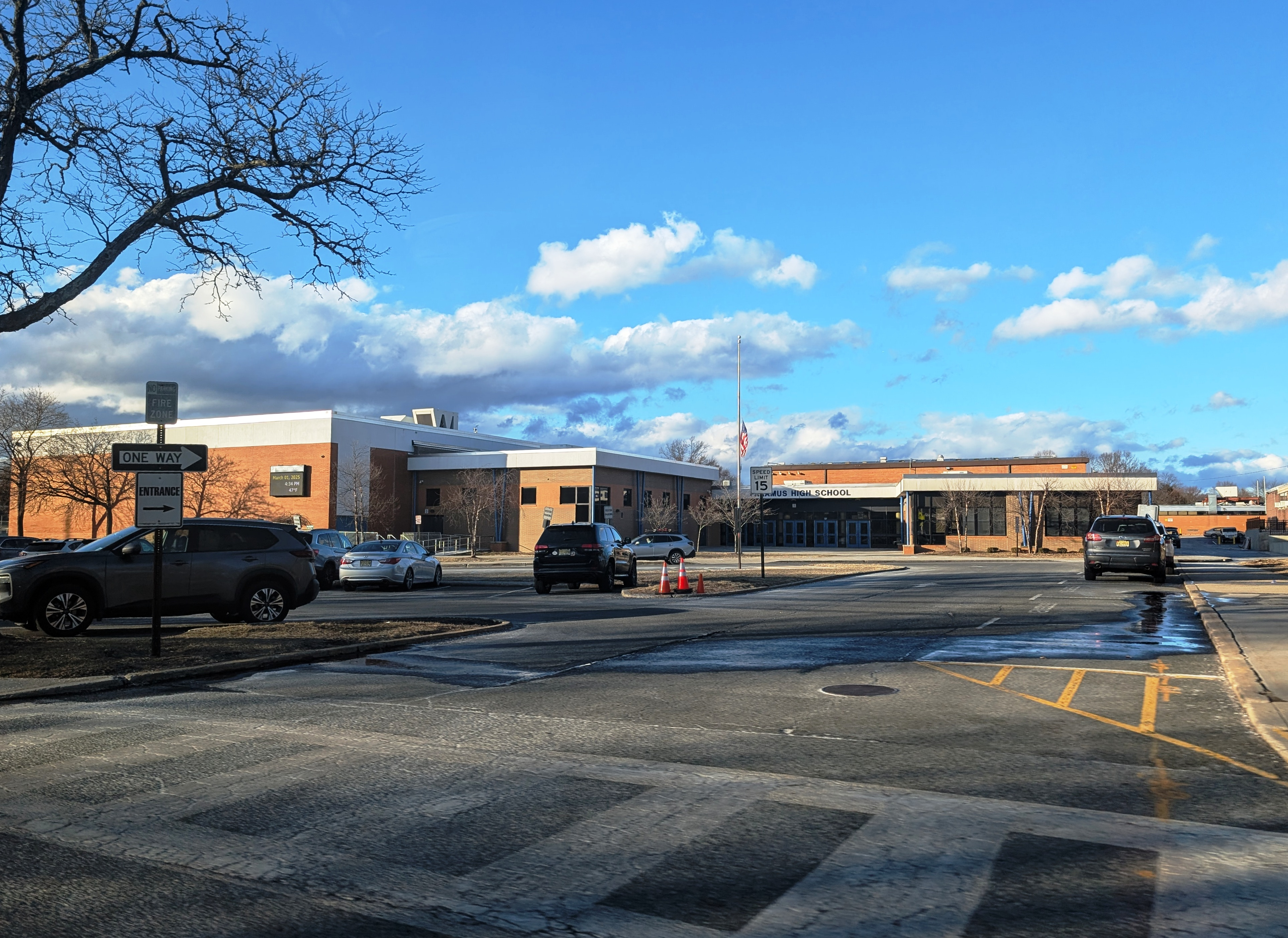

Location
- 99 East Century Road; Paramus, Bergen County, New Jersey 07652; United States; 40.927748°N 74.062185°W

Information
- Type: Public high school
- Established: 1957; 69 years ago
- School district: Paramus Public Schools
- NCES School ID: 341242000688
- Principal: Dominick Miller
- Faculty: 102.2 FTEs
- Grades: 9–12
- Enrollment: 1,153 (as of 2024–25)
- Student to teacher ratio: 11.3:1
- Campus: Suburban
- Athletics conference: Big North Conference (general); North Jersey Super Football Conference (football)
- Team name: Spartans
- Publication: Amaranth (literary magazine)
- Yearbook: Delphian
- Website: phs.paramus.k12.nj.us
- Last updated: October 1, 2024; 2 years ago

Paramus High School is a four-year comprehensive public high school, located in Paramus, in Bergen County, in the U.S. state of New Jersey, serving students in ninth through twelfth grades as the lone secondary school of the Paramus Public Schools. The school has been accredited by the Middle States Association of Colleges and Schools Commission on Elementary and Secondary Schools since 2006.

As of the 2024–25 school year, the school had an enrollment of 1,153 students and 102.2 classroom teachers (on an FTE basis), for a student–teacher ratio of 11.3:1. There were 194 students (16.8% of enrollment) eligible for free lunch and 27 (2.3% of students) eligible for reduced-cost lunch.

Course offerings include Advanced Placement courses available in 26 subjects.

== History ==
Historically, Paramus shared many municipal services with the township of Rochelle Park, including schooling. In 1922, the school situation was the hot topic of discussion. Residents felt that the schools were too far away and wanted to make sure that their children were safe when they went to school. It was because of this that Paramus decided to become a borough of its own.

With a growing population, Paramus officials were notified that students could no longer be accommodated at Hackensack High School or Ridgewood High School. In a 1956 referendum, more than 95% of residents approved the construction of a high school that opened on Spring Valley Road in September 1957 with 900 students in grades 6–10.

The school's 50th anniversary was celebrated in 2007.

== Awards, recognition and rankings ==
For the 1988–89 school year, Paramus High School was awarded the National Blue Ribbon School Award of Excellence by the United States Department of Education, the highest award an American school can receive.

The school was the 57th-ranked public high school in New Jersey out of 339 schools statewide in New Jersey Monthly magazine's September 2014 cover story on the state's "Top Public High Schools", using a new ranking methodology. The school had been ranked 111th in the state of 328 schools in 2012, after being ranked 98th in 2010 out of 322 schools listed. The magazine ranked the school 77th in 2008 out of 316 schools. The school was ranked 45th in the magazine's September 2006 issue, which included 316 schools across the state.

Schooldigger.com ranked the school tied for 124th out of 381 public high schools statewide in its 2011 rankings (a decrease of 44 positions from the 2010 ranking) which were based on the combined percentage of students classified as proficient or above proficient on the mathematics (83.3%) and language arts literacy (97.0%) components of the High School Proficiency Assessment (HSPA).

In the 2011 "Ranking America's High Schools" issue by The Washington Post, the school was ranked 50th in New Jersey and 1,527th nationwide.

In its 2013 report on "America's Best High Schools", The Daily Beast ranked the school 705th in the nation among participating public high schools and 54th among schools in New Jersey.

== Athletics ==
The Paramus High School Spartans compete in the Big North Conference, which is comprised of public and private high schools in Bergen and Passaic counties, and was established following a reorganization of sports leagues in Northern New Jersey by the New Jersey State Interscholastic Athletic Association. The school had participated in the North Jersey Tri-County Conference in 2009–10. Until the NJSIAA's 2009 realignment, the school had participated in Division A of the Northern New Jersey Interscholastic League, which included high schools located in Bergen, Essex and Passaic counties, and was separated into three divisions based on NJSIAA size classification. With 894 students in grades 10–12, the school was classified by the NJSIAA for the 2019–20 school year as Group III for most athletic competition purposes, which included schools with an enrollment of 761 to 1,058 students in that grade range. The football team competes in the Patriot Red division of the North Jersey Super Football Conference, which includes 112 schools competing in 20 divisions, making it the nation's biggest football-only high school sports league. The school was classified by the NJSIAA as Group III North for football for 2024–2026, which included schools with 700 to 884 students.

The school participates as the host school / lead agency in a joint ice hockey team with Hackensack High School and Lyndhurst High School. The co-op program operates under agreements scheduled to expire at the end of the 2023–24 school year.

The baseball program has won more than 800 games since its inception in 1960, which includes four state championships, a county championship, and 13 league championships. Many players have gone on to graduate and continue to play baseball at the collegiate level, several of which played at the NCAA Division 1 level or professionally. Former head coach Joe Cervino, who managed the team for 30 seasons from 1982 to 2011, was one of the most successful coaches in Bergen County history, one of only four coaches to win more than 500 games.

The boys track team won the Group IV spring / outdoor track state championship in 1965.

The girls' volleyball team has won seven state championships, winning the Division A title in 1981 against Northern Valley Regional High School at Old Tappan, taking the Group IV title in 1982 against Hackensack High School, and earning Group III titles in 1988 (vs. Ramsey High School), 1989 (vs. Old Tappan), 1994 (vs. River Dell High School), 1995 (vs. Lakeland Regional High School) and 2005 (vs. Ramapo High School). The program's seven state titles are tied for seventh in the state. The 1981 team won the inaugural NJSIAA state title, winning the Group III-IV championship in two games (15–8 and 15–11) against finals opponent Northern Valley / Old Tappan. The 1982 team won the Group IV state title against Hackensack in two games (15-6 and 15–12). The 1994 girls' volleyball team finished the season with a record of 22–2, winning the league and Group III state title, but lost to Paramus Catholic High School in the Bergen County tournament. The 1995 team won the Group III title for a second consecutive year, and took the Bergen County title with a win over Paramus Catholic. The team won the Tournament of Champions in 2005, defeating Secaucus High School in the tournament finals with a two-game sweep by scores of 25-22 and 25–23.

The boys' wrestling team won the North I Group IV state sectional championship in 1982, 1985, 1998 and 1999, and won the North I Group III title in 1993, 2012, 2015, 2016 and 2022.

The ice hockey team won the Handchen Cup in 2000 with a 6–4 win against Brick Memorial High School in the championship game at the South Mountain Arena.

== Administration ==
The school's principal is Dominick Miller. His core administration team includes two assistant principals and the athletic director.

== Notable alumni ==
Notable Paramus High school alumni include:

- Joe Benigno (born 1953), sports talk show co-host on WFAN
- Stacey Dash (born 1967, class of 1985), actress best known for her role in the movie Clueless and its television spinoff
- Spero Dedes (born 1979), sportscaster
- Bill DeMott (born 1966, class of 1983), retired professional wrestler and road agent best known for his appearances with World Championship Wrestling as Hugh Morrus and World Wrestling Federation/Entertainment under his real name
- Mark Fields (born 1961, class of 1979), Executive Vice President, Ford Motor Company and President, The Americas
- James K. Freericks (born 1963), physicist and author
- Dean Friedman (born 1955), musician with hit song "Ariel", a top-20 tune in 1977
- Matt Ghaffari (born 1961, class of 1979), 1996 Olympic silver-medal wrestler
- Jamie Gold (born 1969, class of 1987), won the 2006 World Series of Poker Main Event
- Victoria Herrmann, polar geographer and climate change communicator
- Lloyd Levin (born 1958, class of 1976), film producer and executive
- Dan Lorenzo, musician, guitarist and composer
- Jeffrey B. Perry (1946–2022), independent scholar, historian and labor activist
- Kenneth W. Regan (born 1959, class of 1977), professor, chess player, statistician, and computer scientist
- John Robertson (born 1993, class of 2011), quarterback for the Villanova Wildcats football team who won the 2014 Walter Payton Award
- Steven H. Temares (born 1958, class of 1976), CEO of Bed Bath & Beyond
- Elaine Zayak (born 1965), figure skater who was the 1982 World champion and 1981 U.S. national champion

== Notable faculty ==
- Bill Pascrell (1937–2024), Congressman who taught at the school for 12 years
- Frank L. Ryerson (1905–1995), music director and trumpeter who wrote the alma mater lyrics
