= Takeo Matsubara =

Japanese physicist

Takeo Matsubara 松原武生
- Born: April 3, 1921; Osaka, Japan
- Died: December 15, 2014 (aged 93); Tokyo, Japan
- Education: Osaka University
- Known for: Matsubara frequency Green's function Matsubara-Toyozawa model
- Awards: Nishina Memorial Prize (1961)
- Scientific career
- Fields: Physics
- Workplaces: Hokkaido University; Kyoto University; Okayama University of Science

Takeo Matsubara (松原武生, Takeo Matsubara; April 3, 1921 - December 15, 2014) was a Japanese physicist. Matsubara proposed a method of statistical mechanics related to Green's function (many-body theory), by applying quantum field theory techniques to statistical physics. This method, commonly known as Matsubara Green's function technique, introduces the notion of imaginary time, and the reciprocal variable to this imaginary time is known as discrete Matsubara frequency.

Matsubara graduated from Osaka Imperial University, and worked as full professor in Hokkaido University, Kyoto University, and Okayama University of Science. He was the winner of the Nishina Memorial Prize in 1961, and took the directorship of the Physical Society of Japan.

His work with Yukata Toyozawa on impurity bands in semiconductors has led to the Matsubara-Toyozawa model that describes the motion of an electron in a random lattice.

His research interests were dielectric materials, superconductivity and superfluidity. He wrote various physics textbooks in Japanese.
