= Dynamical mean-field theory =

Method to determine the electronic structure of strongly correlated materials

Dynamical mean-field theory (DMFT) is a method to determine the electronic structure of strongly correlated materials. In such materials, the approximation of independent electrons, which is used in density functional theory and usual band structure calculations, breaks down. Dynamical mean-field theory, a non-perturbative treatment of local interactions between electrons, bridges the gap between the nearly free electron gas limit and the atomic limit of condensed-matter physics.

DMFT consists in mapping a many-body lattice problem to a many-body local problem, called an impurity model. While the lattice problem is in general intractable, the impurity model is usually solvable through various schemes. The mapping in itself does not constitute an approximation. The only approximation made in ordinary DMFT schemes is to assume the lattice self-energy to be a momentum-independent (local) quantity. This approximation becomes exact in the limit of lattices with an infinite coordination.

One of DMFT's main successes is to describe the phase transition between a metal and a Mott insulator when the strength of electronic correlations is increased. It has been successfully applied to real materials, in combination with the local density approximation of density functional theory.

== Relation to mean-field theory ==
The DMFT treatment of lattice quantum models is similar to the mean-field theory (MFT) treatment of classical models such as the Ising model. In the Ising model, the lattice problem is mapped onto an effective single site problem, whose magnetization is to reproduce the lattice magnetization through an effective "mean-field". This condition is called the self-consistency condition. It stipulates that the single-site observables should reproduce the lattice "local" observables by means of an effective field. While the N-site Ising Hamiltonian is hard to solve analytically (to date, analytical solutions exist only for the 1D and 2D case), the single-site problem is easily solved.

Likewise, DMFT maps a lattice problem (e.g. the Hubbard model) onto a single-site problem. In DMFT, the local observable is the local Green's function. Thus, the self-consistency condition for DMFT is for the impurity Green's function to reproduce the lattice local Green's function through an effective mean-field which, in DMFT, is the hybridization function $\Delta(\tau)$ of the impurity model. DMFT owes its name to the fact that the mean-field $\Delta(\tau)$ is time-dependent, or dynamical. This also points to the major difference between the Ising MFT and DMFT: Ising MFT maps the N-spin problem into a single-site, single-spin problem. DMFT maps the lattice problem onto a single-site problem, but the latter fundamentally remains a N-body problem which captures the temporal fluctuations due to electron-electron correlations.

== Description of DMFT for the Hubbard model ==
=== Mapping ===
==== Single-orbital Hubbard model ====
The Hubbard model describes the onsite interaction between electrons of opposite spin by a single parameter, $U$. The Hubbard Hamiltonian may take the following form:

$$H_{\text{Hubbard}}=t \sum_{\langle ij \rangle \sigma}  c_{i\sigma}^{\dagger}c_{j\sigma} + U\sum_{i}n_{i \uparrow} n_{i\downarrow}$$

where, on suppressing the spin 1/2 indices $\sigma$, $c_i^{\dagger},c_i$ denote the creation and annihilation operators of an electron on a localized orbital on site $i$, and $n_i=c_i^{\dagger}c_i$.

The following assumptions have been made:

- only one orbital contributes to the electronic properties (as might be the case of copper atoms in superconducting cuprates, whose $d$-bands are non-degenerate),
- the orbitals are so localized that only nearest-neighbor hopping $t$ is taken into account

==== Auxiliary problem: the Anderson impurity model ====
The Hubbard model is in general intractable under usual perturbation expansion techniques. DMFT maps this lattice model onto the so-called Anderson impurity model (AIM). This model describes the interaction of one site (the impurity) with a "bath" of electronic levels (described by the annihilation and creation operators $a_{p\sigma}$ and $a_{p\sigma}^{\dagger}$) through a hybridization function. The Anderson model corresponding to our single-site model is a single-orbital Anderson impurity model, whose hamiltonian formulation, on suppressing some spin 1/2 indices $\sigma$, is:

$$H_{\text{AIM}}=\underbrace{\sum_{p}\epsilon_p a_p^{\dagger}a_p}_{H_{\text{bath}}} + \underbrace{\sum_{p\sigma}\left(V_{p}^{\sigma}c_{\sigma}^{\dagger}a_{p\sigma}+h.c.\right)}_{H_{\text{mix}}}+\underbrace{U n_{\uparrow} n_{\downarrow}-\mu \left(n_{\uparrow}+n_{\downarrow}\right)}_{H_{\text{loc}}}$$

where

- $H_{\text{bath}}$ describes the non-correlated electronic levels $\epsilon_p$ of the bath
- $H_{\text{loc}}$ describes the impurity, where two electrons interact with the energetical cost $U$
- $H_{\text{mix}}$ describes the hybridization (or coupling) between the impurity and the bath through hybridization terms $V_p^{\sigma}$

The Matsubara Green's function of this model, defined by $G_{\text{imp}}(\tau) = - \langle T c(\tau) c^{\dagger}(0)\rangle$, is entirely determined by the parameters $U,\mu$ and the so-called hybridization function $\Delta_\sigma(i\omega_n) = \sum_{p}\frac{|V_p^\sigma|^2}{i\omega_n-\epsilon_p}$, which is the imaginary-time Fourier-transform of $\Delta_{\sigma}(\tau)$.

This hybridization function describes the dynamics of electrons hopping in and out of the bath. It should reproduce the lattice dynamics such that the impurity Green's function is the same as the local lattice Green's function. It is related to the non-interacting Green's function by the relation:

$(\mathcal{G}_0)^{-1}(i\omega_n)=i\omega_n+\mu-\Delta(i\omega_n)$ (1)

Solving the Anderson impurity model consists in computing observables such as the interacting Green's function $G(i\omega_n)$ for a given hybridization function $\Delta(i\omega_n)$ and $U,\mu$. It is a difficult but not intractable problem. There exists a number of ways to solve the AIM, such as

- Numerical renormalization group
- Exact diagonalization
- Iterative perturbation theory
- Non-crossing approximation
- Continuous-time quantum Monte Carlo algorithms

=== Self-consistency equations ===
The self-consistency condition requires the impurity Green's function $G_\mathrm{imp}(\tau)$ to coincide with the local lattice Green's function $G_{ii}(\tau) = -\langle T c_i(\tau)c_i^{\dagger}(0)\rangle$:

$$G_\mathrm{imp}(i\omega_n) = G_{ii}(i\omega_n) =  \sum_k \frac {1}{i\omega_n +\mu - \epsilon(k) - \Sigma(k,i\omega_n)} =  G_\mathrm{loc}(i\omega_n)$$

where $\Sigma(k,i\omega_n)$ denotes the lattice self-energy.

=== DMFT approximation: locality of the lattice self-energy ===
The only DMFT approximations (apart from the approximation that can be made in order to solve the Anderson model) consists in neglecting the spatial fluctuations of the lattice self-energy, by equating it to the impurity self-energy:

$$\Sigma(k,i\omega_n) \approx \Sigma_{imp}(i\omega_n)$$

This approximation becomes exact in the limit of lattices with infinite coordination, that is when the number of neighbors of each site is infinite. Indeed, one can show that in the diagrammatic expansion of the lattice self-energy, only local diagrams survive when one goes into the infinite coordination limit.

Thus, as in classical mean-field theories, DMFT is supposed to get more accurate as the dimensionality (and thus the number of neighbors) increases. Put differently, for low dimensions, spatial fluctuations will render the DMFT approximation less reliable.

Spatial fluctuations also become relevant in the vicinity of phase transitions. Here, DMFT and classical mean-field theories result in mean-field critical exponents, the pronounced changes before the phase transition are not reflected in the DMFT self-energy.

=== DMFT loop ===
In order to find the local lattice Green's function, one has to determine the hybridization function such that the corresponding impurity Green's function will coincide with the sought-after local lattice Green's function. The most widespread way of solving this problem is by using a forward recursion method, namely, for a given $U$, $\mu$ and temperature $T$:

1. Start with a guess for $\Sigma(k,i\omega_n)$ (typically, $\Sigma(k,i\omega_n)=0$)
2. Make the DMFT approximation: $\Sigma(k,i\omega_n) \approx \Sigma_\mathrm{imp}(i\omega_n)$
3. Compute the local Green's function $G_\mathrm{loc}(i\omega_n)$
4. Compute the dynamical mean field $\Delta(i\omega) = i\omega_n + \mu - G^{-1}_\mathrm{loc}(i\omega_n) - \Sigma_\mathrm{imp}(i\omega_n)$
5. Solve the AIM for a new impurity Green's function $G_\mathrm{imp}(i\omega_n)$, extract its self-energy: $\Sigma_\mathrm{imp}(i\omega_n) = (\mathcal{G}_0)^{-1}(i\omega_n) - (G_\mathrm{imp})^{-1}(i\omega_n)$
6. Go back to step 2 until convergence, namely when $G_\mathrm{imp}^n = G_\mathrm{imp}^{n+1}$.

== Applications ==
The local lattice Green's function and other impurity observables can be used to calculate a number of physical quantities as a function of correlations $U$, bandwidth, filling (chemical potential $\mu$), and temperature $T$:

- the spectral function (which gives the band structure)
- the kinetic energy
- the double occupancy of a site
- response functions (compressibility, optical conductivity, specific heat)

In particular, the drop of the double-occupancy as $U$ increases is a signature of the Mott transition.

== Extensions ==
DMFT has several extensions, extending the above formalism to multi-orbital, multi-site problems, long-range correlations and non-equilibrium.

=== Multi-orbital extension ===
DMFT can be extended to Hubbard models with multiple orbitals, namely with electron-electron interactions of the form $U_{\alpha \beta} n_{\alpha}n_{\beta}$ where $\alpha$ and $\beta$ denote different orbitals. The combination with density functional theory (DFT+DMFT) then allows for a realistic calculation of correlated materials.

=== Extended DMFT ===
Extended DMFT yields a local impurity self energy for non-local interactions and hence allows us to apply DMFT for more general models such as the t-J model.

=== Cluster DMFT ===
In order to improve on the DMFT approximation, the Hubbard model can be mapped on a multi-site impurity (cluster) problem, which allows one to add some spatial dependence to the impurity self-energy. Clusters contain 4 to 8 sites at low temperature and up to 100 sites at high temperature.

The Typical Medium Dynamical Cluster Approximation (TMDCA) is a non-perturbative approach for obtaining the electronic ground state of strongly correlated many-body systems, built on the dynamical cluster approximation (DCA).

=== Diagrammatic extensions ===
Spatial dependencies of the self energy beyond DMFT, including long-range correlations in the vicinity of a phase transition, can be obtained also through diagrammatic extensions of DMFT using a combination of analytical and numerical techniques. The starting point of the dynamical vertex approximation and of the dual fermion approach is the local two-particle vertex.

=== Non-equilibrium ===
DMFT has been employed to study non-equilibrium transport and optical excitations. Here, the reliable calculation of the AIM's Green function out of equilibrium remains a big challenge. DMFT has also been applied to ecological models in order to describe the mean-field dynamics of a community with a thermodynamic number of species.

== See also ==
- Strongly correlated material
