= Paramus Public Schools =

School district in Bergen County, New Jersey, US

Address
- 145 Spring Valley Road Paramus, Bergen County, New Jersey, 07652; United States
- Coordinates: 40.927595°N 74.057984°W

District information
- Grades: PreK-12
- Superintendent: Sean Adams
- Business administrator: Brooke Bartley
- Schools: 8

Students and staff
- Enrollment: 3,594 (as of 2023–24)
- Faculty: 335.7 FTEs
- Student–teacher ratio: 10.7:1

Other information
- District Factor Group: GH
- Website: www.paramus.k12.nj.us
Ind.	Per pupil	District spending	Rank (*)	K-12 average	%± vs. average
1A	Total Spending	$20,521	80	$18,891	8.6%
1	Budgetary Cost	16,877	87	14,783	14.2%
2	Classroom Instruction	9,285	75	8,763	6.0%
6	Support Services	2,447	64	2,392	2.3%
8	Administrative Cost	1,906	103	1,485	28.4%
10	Operations & Maintenance	2,754	98	1,783	54.5%
13	Extracurricular Activities	364	94	268	35.8%
16	Median Teacher Salary	63,850	47	64,043
Data from NJDoE 2014 Taxpayers' Guide to Education Spending. *Of K-12 districts with more than 3,500 students. Lowest spending=1; Highest=103

The Paramus Public Schools is a comprehensive community public school district that serves students in kindergarten through twelfth grade from Paramus, in Bergen County, in the U.S. state of New Jersey.

As of the 2023–24 school year, the district, comprised of eight schools, had an enrollment of 3,594 students and 335.7 classroom teachers (on an FTE basis), for a student–teacher ratio of 10.7:1.

== History ==
With a growing population, Paramus officials were notified that students could no longer be accommodated at Hackensack High School or Ridgewood High School. In a 1956 referendum, more than 95% of residents approved the construction of a high school that opened on Spring Valley Road in September 1957 with 900 students in grades 6–10.

The district had been classified by the New Jersey Department of Education as being in District Factor Group "GH", the third-highest of eight groupings. District Factor Groups organize districts statewide to allow comparison by common socioeconomic characteristics of the local districts. From lowest socioeconomic status to highest, the categories are A, B, CD, DE, FG, GH, I and J.

== Awards and recognition ==
Three of the district's schools have been formally designated as National Blue Ribbon Schools, the highest honor that an American school can achieve: Paramus High School in 1988-89, Parkway Elementary School in 1987-88 and Ridge Ranch Elementary School in 1998-99.

For the 1995-96 school year, Ridge Ranch Elementary School was named as a "Star School" by the New Jersey Department of Education, the highest honor that a New Jersey school can achieve.

The district was selected as one of the top "100 Best Communities for Music Education in America 2005" by the American Music Conference, and was selected again for this honor in 2006.

The NAMM Foundation named the district in its 2008 survey of the "Best Communities for Music Education", which included 110 school districts nationwide. The district was also named in the foundation's 2009 survey of the "Best Communities for Music Education", which included 124 school districts nationwide.

== Schools ==
Schools in the district, with 2023–24 enrollment data from the National Center for Education Statistics, are:

Elementary schools

- Memorial Elementary School with 295 students in grades PreK–4
  - Michelle Higgins, principal
- Midland Elementary School with 193 students in grades K–4
  - Thomas LoBue, principal
- Parkway Elementary School with 294 students in grades PreK–4
  - Suzanne Barbi, principal
- Ridge Ranch Elementary School with 343 students in grades K–4
  - Jeanine Nostrame, principal
- Stony Lane Elementary School with 201 students in grades K–4
  - Thomas Marshall, principal

Middle schools

- East Brook Middle School with 592 students in grades 5–8
  - Ryan Aupperlee, principal
- West Brook Middle School with 517 students in grades 5–8
  - Deirdre Spollen-LaRaia, principal

High school

- Paramus High School with 1,125 students in grades 9–12
  - Dominick Miller, principal

== Controversies and incidents ==
In late May 2007, The Record reported that officials of the Paramus Public Schools had knowingly failed to report the presence of the banned pesticides aldrin, dieldrin and chlordane on the campus of West Brook, a middle school in the system. Responding to local outrage, the superintendent, Janice Dime, assured in a letter addressed to the public that the chemicals were not hazardous, however, borough mayor, Jim Tedesco, described Dime's statement as being either misinformed or deliberately misleading. Because of public pressure, on June 6, 2007, the district's board of education placed Janice Dime on an extended leave and shut down West Brook Middle School for decontamination and testing. On June 13, test results done by a borough-contracted firm revealed that two of the 30 tested areas on campus had levels of chlordane that exceeded state safety standards. After the incident more soil tests were conducted around the area and in other parts of Paramus, with some yielding positive for excessive presence of pesticide. West Brook was decontaminated and reopened to students, while Janice Dime resigned from her position as superintendent in August 2007.

In May 2018, a 51-year-old teacher, Jennifer Williamson, and a ten-year-old student at East Brook Middle School, Miranda Faith Vargas, were killed and dozens of students were injured when a dump truck slammed into their school bus on Interstate 80 while travelling on a field trip to Waterloo Village. The 77-year-old driver, who had had his driver's license suspended 14 times before the accident, was charged with vehicular homicide, which could lead to a sentence of ten years in jail upon conviction. Days after the crash, Cong. Josh Gottheimer pushed for a federal law requiring school buses to have seat belts to prevent deaths in similar types of crashes.

== Administration ==
Core members of the district's administration are:

- Sean Adams, superintendent
- Brooke Bartley, business administrator and board secretary

== Board of education ==
The district's board of education, comprised of nine members, sets policy and oversees the fiscal and educational operation of the district through its administration. As a Type II school district, the board's trustees are elected directly by voters to serve three-year terms of office on a staggered basis, with three seats up for election each year held (since 2012) as part of the November general election. The board appoints a superintendent to oversee the district's day-to-day operations and a business administrator to supervise the business functions of the district.
