= Okayama University of Science =

Private university in Okayama, Japan

Coordinates: 34°41′46″N 133°55′37″E

- 岡山理科大学
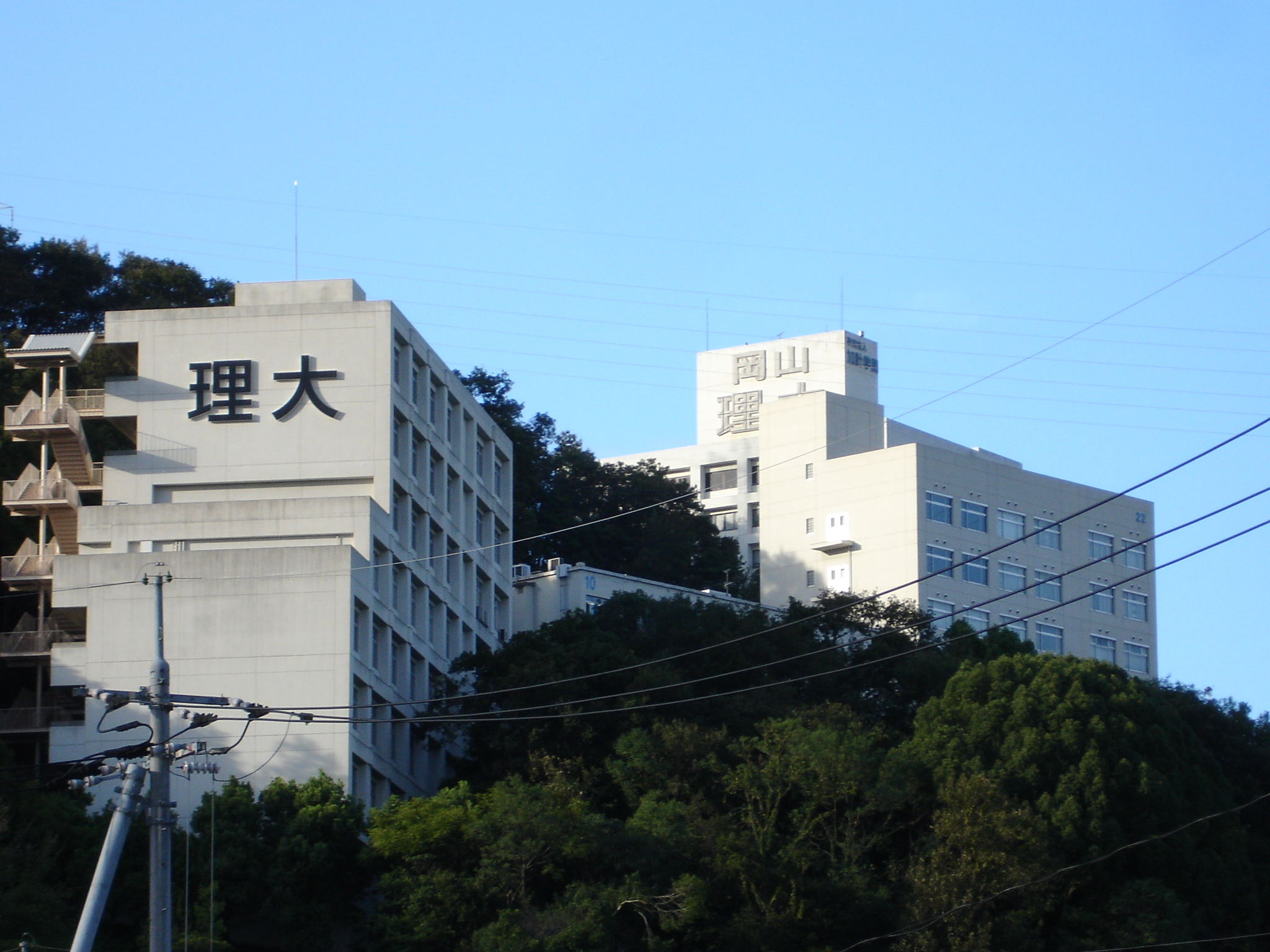
- Type: Private STEM
- Established: 1964
- President: Hiroyuki Hirano
- Location: Okayama, Japan
- Language: Japanese
- Website: www.ous.ac.jp/en/

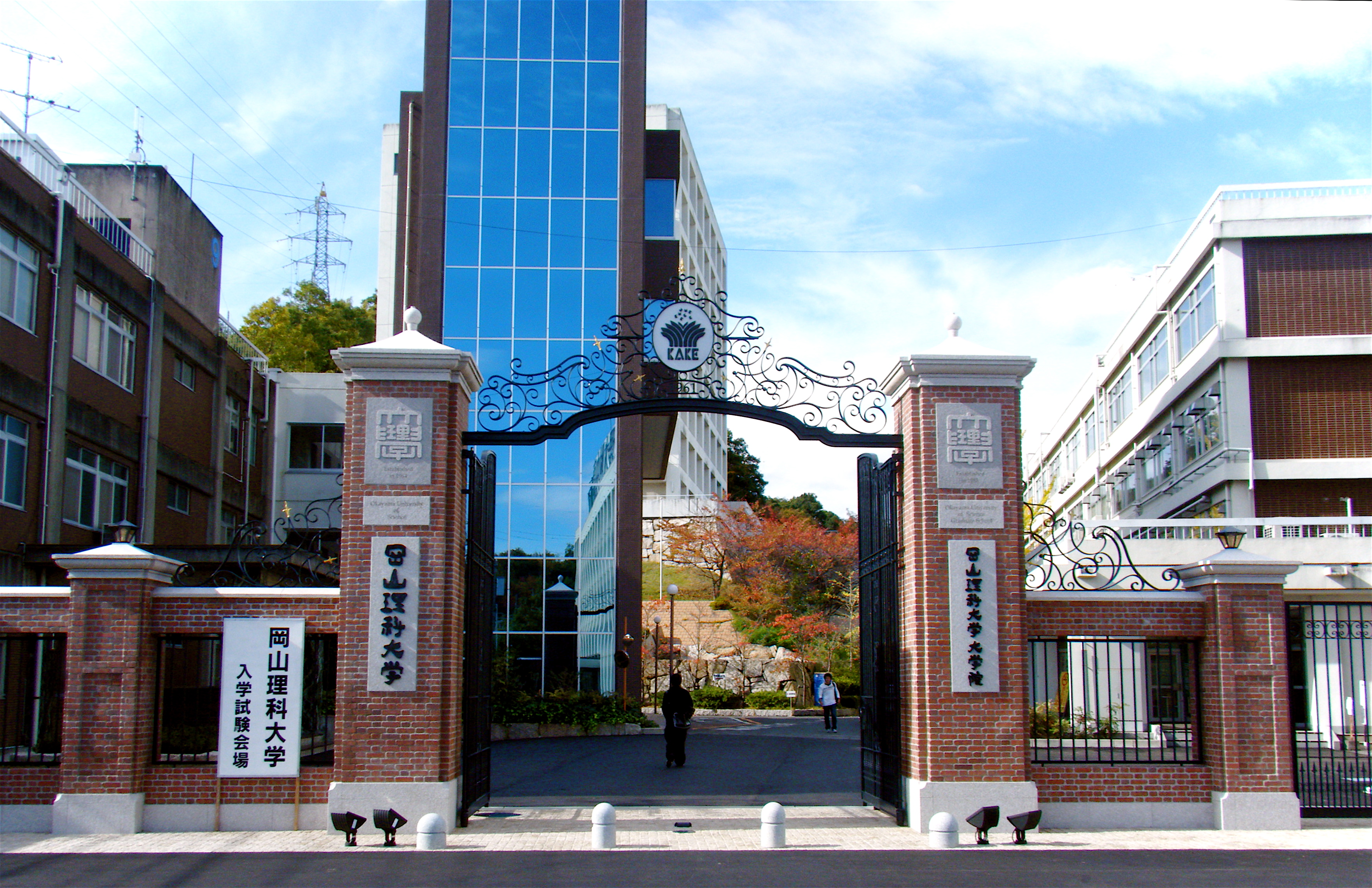
Entrance

Okayama University of Science (岡山理科大学, Okayama rika daigaku) is a private university in Okayama, Okayama, Japan, established in 1964. It is predominantly a school of science and engineering.

== Notable events ==
From 2015–2018, Okayama University of Science's operator, the group Kake Gakuen, applied for permission to open a new school of veterinary medicine in Ehime Prefecture, across the water from Okayama on the island of Shikoku. This school would be a branch of the Okayama University of Science. The government's aid in sweeping away regulatory concerns and speeding the process ignited accusations of corruption, as Prime Minister Shinzo Abe was friends with the owner of Kake Gakuen, Kotaro Kake.

In 2020, another controversy broke out after it was revealed that all ethnically Korean students applying to the university's recently added school of veterinary medicine in October 2019 were denied and failed with scores of zero (out of fifty) on their entrance examination.

== Notable people ==
Graduates:

- Yu Suzuki, an engineer and game programmer who worked for Sega and helped implement many of their famous video games
- Koji Mise, a baseball player for Okayama's college team that went on to the Nippon Professional Baseball league

Faculty:

- Akira Suzuki, a chemist and Nobel Prize laureate who served as a visiting professor for a year in the chemistry department, from 1994–1995
- Kent Gilbert, a gaijin tarento minor celebrity and proponent of revisionist far-right Japanese historiography that downplays Japanese war crimes in World War II

== See also ==
- 加計学園問題#関係者による発言, an article on the Kake Gakuen scandal
