= The Arctic Institute – Center for Circumpolar Security Studies =

American-based think tank

The Arctic Institute - Center for Circumpolar Security Studies
- Abbreviation: TAI
- Formation: 2011; 15 years ago
- Type: Public policy-Think tank
- Headquarters: Washington D.C.
- Managing Director: Romain Chuffart
- Key people: Victoria Herrman; Andreas Raspotnik; Pavel Devyatkin; Malte Humpert (founder)
- Website: www.thearcticinstitute.org

The Arctic Institute (TAI) is a think tank founded in 2011 and headquartered in Washington, D.C. Romain Chuffart has been managing director since September 2022.

The University of Pennsylvania's Global Go To Think Tank Index has.

== Collaboration ==
The Arctic Institute has collaborated with a number of academic institutions, non-governmental organizations, non-profit organizations, businesses, and individuals.

== Awards ==
The Arctic Institute has consistently been ranked as a Top 100 Think Tank in the United States by the University of Pennsylvania's Think Tanks and Civil Society Program since 2016. In 2021 it was ranked 72nd in the United States.
