= Matsubara Station =

Matsubara Station is the name of two train stations in Japan.

- Matsubara Station (Nagasaki) - (松原駅) in Nagasaki Prefecture
- Matsubara Station (Tokyo) - (松原駅) in Tokyo
