= Takehisa Matsubara =

Japanese politician

- 松原 武久

Mayor of Nagoya
- In office 28 April 1997 – 27 April 2009
- Preceded by: Takeyoshi Nishio
- Succeeded by: Takashi Kawamura

Personal details
- Born: 26 January 1937 (age 89) Owariasahi, Aichi, Japan
- Party: Independent
- Education: Aichi University of Education

Takehisa Matsubara (松原 武久, Matsubara Takehisa; born 26 January 1937) is a Japanese politician who served as the 20th mayor of Nagoya City in Aichi Prefecture, Japan. A native of Owariasahi, also in Aichi Prefecture, and graduate of Aichi University of Education. He was first elected in April 1997.

== Biography ==
Matsubara served as a primary and secondary school teacher in his early career. His subject was the national language of Japan, Japanese. He was later a school principal and also Superintendent of Schools for the City of Nagoya. He was inaugurated as Mayor of Nagoya in April 1997. In 2005 he was elected to his third term as mayor. In City Council he has welcomed recommendations from all factions and parties barring only the JCP (Japanese Communist Party) representative. He has been known to show great enthusiasm for large building projects, but has been weak on social welfare issues.

On 23 October 2008, Mayor Matsubara announced that he would not be running for re-election in the Spring of 2009 due to health concerns over his advanced age (71). The Asahi Shimbun reports, however, that fall-out from his recent "slush fund" scandal may also have contributed to his decision to stand down after more than a decade in office.

On 1 April 2015, he was appointed the president of Tokai Gakuen University in Miyoshi, Aichi.

Political offices
Preceded by 西尾武喜	Mayor of Nagoya; 1997–2009	Succeeded by Takashi Kawamura
