= Polar metal =

A polar metal, metallic ferroelectric, or ferroelectric metal is a metal that contains an electric dipole moment. Its components have an ordered electric dipole. Such metals should be unexpected, because the charge should conduct by way of the free electrons in the metal and neutralize the polarized charge. However they do exist. Probably the first report of a polar metal was in single crystals of the cuprate superconductors YBa_{2}Cu_{3}O_{7−δ}. A polarization was observed along one (001) axis by pyroelectric effect measurements, and the sign of the polarization was shown to be reversible, while its magnitude could be increased by poling with an electric field. The polarization was found to disappear in the superconducting state. The lattice distortions responsible were considered to be a result of oxygen ion displacements induced by doped charges that break inversion symmetry. The effect was utilized for fabrication of pyroelectric detectors for space applications, having the advantage of large pyroelectric coefficient and low intrinsic resistance. Another substance family that can produce a polar metal is the nickelate perovskites. One example interpreted to show polar metallic behavior is lanthanum nickelate, LaNiO_{3}. A thin film of LaNiO_{3} grown on the (111) crystal face of lanthanum aluminate, (LaAlO_{3}) was interpreted to be both conductor and a polar material at room temperature. The resistivity of this system, however, shows an upturn with decreasing temperature, hence does not strictly adhere to the definition of a metal. Also, when grown 3 or 4 unit cells thick (1-2 nm) on the (100) crystal face of LaAlO_{3}, the LaNiO_{3} can be a polar insulator or polar metal depending on the atomic termination of the surface. Lithium osmate, LiOsO_{3} also undergoes a ferrorelectric transition when it is cooled below 140K. The point group changes from R3̅c to R3c losing its centrosymmetry. At room temperature and below, lithium osmate is an electric conductor, in single crystal, polycrystalline or powder forms, and the ferroelectric form only appears below 140K. Above 140K the material behaves like a normal metal. Artificial two-dimensional polar metal by charge transfer to a ferroelectric insulator has been realized in LaAlO_{3}/Ba_{0.8}Sr_{0.2}TiO_{3}/SrTiO_{3} complex oxide heterostructures.

Native metallicity and ferroelectricity has been observed at room temperature in bulk single-crystalline tungsten ditelluride (WTe_{2}); a transition metal dichalcogenide (TMDC). It has bistable and electrically switchable spontaneous polarization states indicating ferroelectricity. Coexistence of metallic behavior and switchable electric polarization in WTe_{2}, which is a layered material, has been observed in the low-thickness limit of two- and three-layers. Calculations suggest this originates from vertical charge transfer between the layers, which is switched by interlayer sliding. In April 2022 another polar metal at room temperature was reported which was also magnetic, skyrmions and the Rashba–Edelstein effect were observed.

P. W. Anderson and E. I. Blount predicted that a ferroelectric metal could exist in 1965. They were inspired to make this prediction based on superconducting transitions, and the ferroelectric transition in barium titanate. The prediction was that atoms do not move far and only a slight crystal non-symmetrical deformation occurs, say from cubic to tetragonal. This transition they called martensitic. They suggested looking at sodium tungsten bronze and InTl alloy. They realised that the free electrons in the metal would neutralise the effect of the polarization at a global level, but that the conduction electrons do not strongly affect transverse optical phonons, or the local electric field inherent in ferroelectricity.
