= Complex oxide =

Oxide compound with cations of multiple elements or different oxidation states

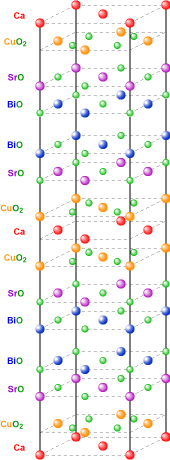
The crystal structure of bismuth strontium calcium copper oxide, a high-temperature superconductor and complex oxide.

A complex oxide is a chemical compound that contains oxygen and at least two other elements (or oxygen and just one other element that's in at least two oxidation states). Complex oxide materials are notable for their wide range of magnetic and electronic properties, such as ferromagnetism, ferroelectricity, and high-temperature superconductivity. These properties often come from their strongly correlated electrons in d or f orbitals.

== Natural occurrence ==
Many minerals found in the ground are complex oxides. Commonly studied mineral crystal families include spinels and perovskites.

== Applications ==
Complex oxide materials are used in a variety of commercial applications.

=== Magnets ===
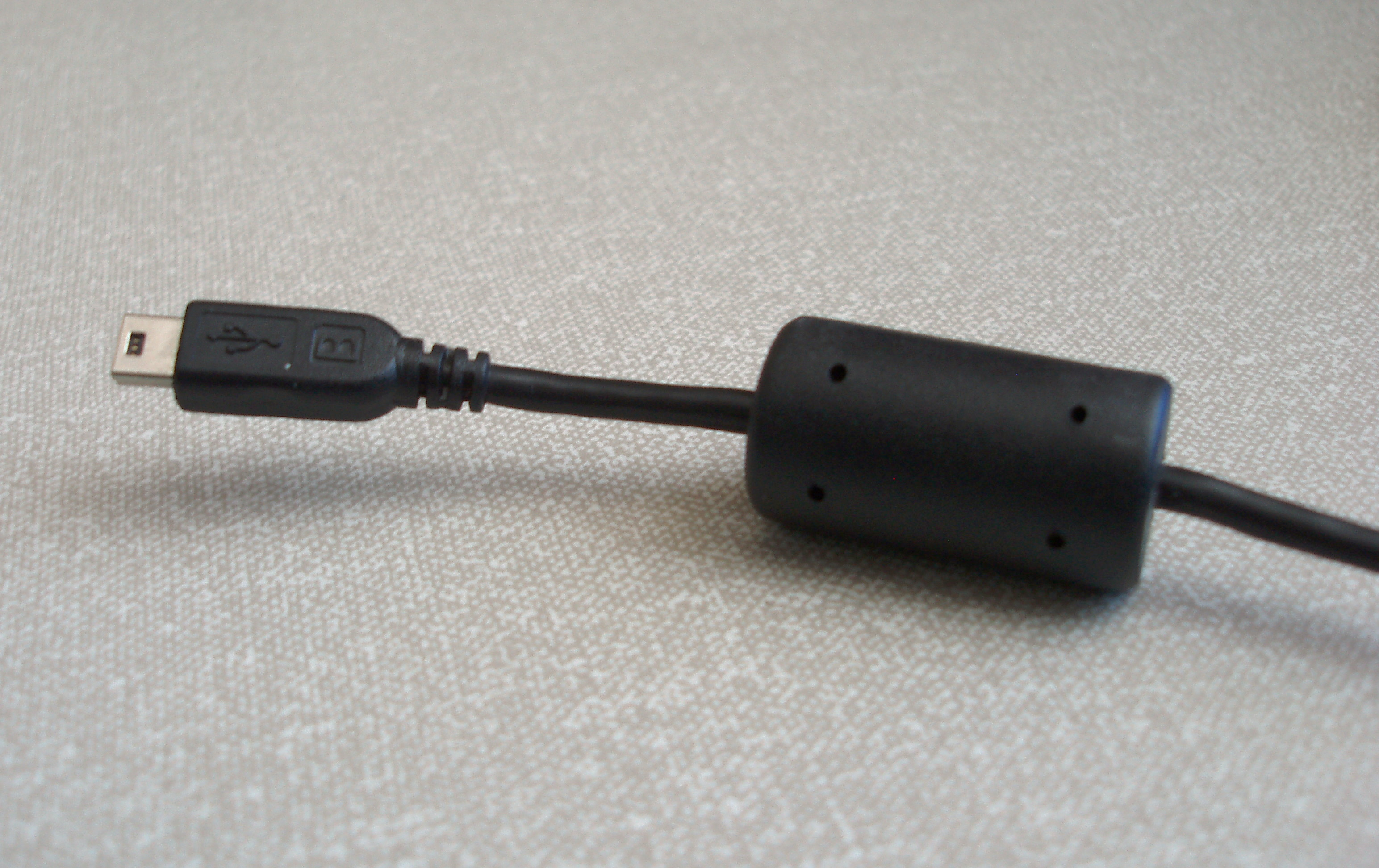
A ferrite bead near the end of a Mini USB cable helps suppress high-frequency noise.

Magnets made of the complex oxide ferrite are commonly used in transformer cores and in inductors. Ferrites are ideal for these applications because they are magnetic, electrically insulating, and inexpensive.

=== Transducers and actuators ===
Piezoelectric transducers and actuators are often made of the complex oxide PZT (lead zirconate titanate). These transducers are used in applications such ultrasound imaging and some microphones. PZT is also sometimes used for piezo ignition in lighters and gas grills.

=== Capacitors ===
Complex oxide materials are the dominant dielectric material in ceramic capacitors. About one trillion ceramic capacitors are produced each year to be used in electronic equipment.

=== Fuel cells ===
Solid oxide fuel cells often use complex oxide materials as their electrolytes, anodes, and cathodes.

=== Gemstone jewelry ===
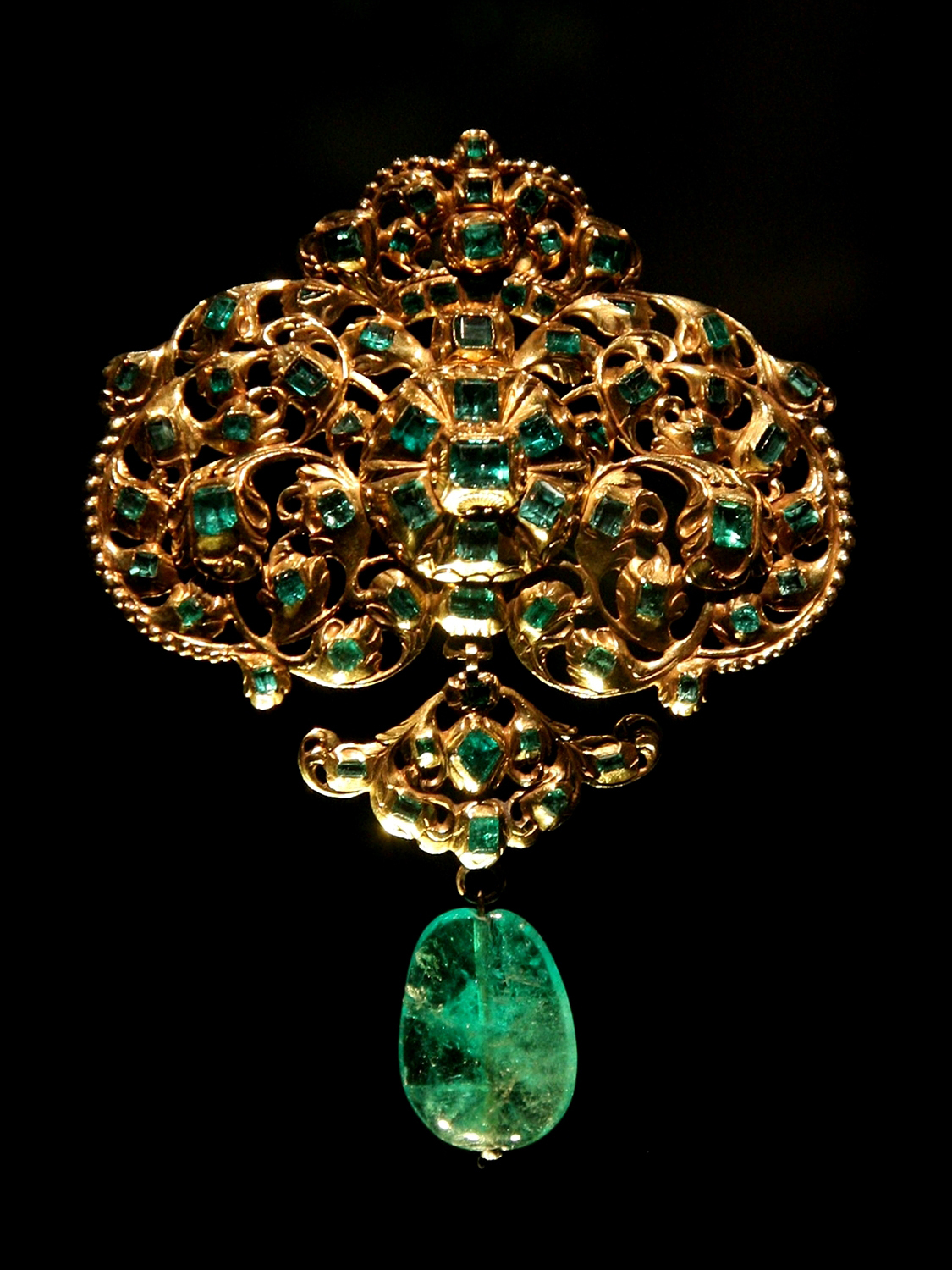
Spanish-made emerald and gold pendant exhibited at Victoria and Albert Museum.

Many precious gemstones, such as emerald and topaz, are complex oxide crystals. Historically, some complex oxide materials (such as strontium titanate, yttrium aluminium garnet, and gadolinium gallium garnet) were also synthesized as inexpensive diamond simulants, though after 1976 they were mostly eclipsed by cubic zirconia.

=== New electronic devices ===
As of 2015, there is research underway to commercialize complex oxides in new kinds of electronic devices, such as ReRAM, FeRAM, and memristors. Complex oxide materials are also being researched for their use in spintronics.

Another potential application of complex oxide materials is superconducting power lines. A few companies have invested in pilot projects, but the technology is not widespread.

== Commonly studied complex oxides ==
- Barium titanate (a multiferroic material)
- Bismuth ferrite (a multiferroic material)
- Bismuth strontium calcium copper oxide (a high-temperature superconductor)
- Lanthanum aluminate (a high-dielectric insulator)
- Lanthanum strontium manganite (a material exhibiting colossal magnetoresistance)
- Lead zirconate titanate (a piezoelectric material)
- Strontium titanate (a high-dielectric semiconductor)
- Yttrium barium copper oxide (a high-temperature superconductor)

== See also ==
- Colossal magnetoresistance
- Half-metal
- Lanthanum aluminate-strontium titanate interface
- Mixed oxide
- Mott insulator
- Multiferroics
