= Harold Y. Hwang =

American physicist

Harold Yoonsung Hwang (born 4 August 1970 in Pasadena, California) is an American physicist, specializing in materials physics, condensed matter physics, nanoscience, and quantum engineering.

== Education and career ==
Harold Hwang graduated in 1993 from MIT with B.S. in physics, as well as B.S. and M.S. in electrical engineering. He received in 1997 his Ph.D. from Princeton University with thesis advisor Nai Phuan Ong. At Bell Laboratories in New Jersey, Hwang was from 1994 to 1996 a research assistant and from 1996 to 2003 a member of the technical staff. At the department of advanced materials science and the department of applied physics at University of Tokyo in Kashiwa, Japan, he was from 2003 to 2008 an associate professor and from 2009 a full professor. From 2006 to 2007 he was also a visiting associate professor at the Institute for Chemical Research at Kyoto University. Since 2010, he has been a professor of physics at the department of applied physics at Stanford University and team leader of the Correlated Electron Research Group at the RIKEN Advanced Science Institute in Wakō, Saitama, Japan.

== Research ==
As a Ph.D. student, Hwang was part of a team that discovered that spin-polarized tunnel currents in polycrystalline manganates produce very high magnetoresistances. During his time at Bell Laboratories, his team developed methods for studying the "nature and length scales of charge screening in complex oxides" and how "short-length-scale electronic response can be probed and incorporated in thin-film oxide heterostructures" and also pointed out a two-dimensional metallic state at the interface between the band insulators LaAlO_{3} and SrTiO_{3}. Subsequently, his team did research on phenomena which emerge at interfaces between oxide materials.

An article that Hwang co-authored with Jan Hendrik Schön and two other physicists was published in April 2001 in the journal Science, but was retracted in November 2002.

== Awards and honors ==
In 2005 he received the Materials Research Society Outstanding Young Investigator Award. In 2008 he received the IBM Japan Science Prize and in 2013 the Ho-Am Prize in Science in Science. On 18th June 2014 he received, together with Jochen Mannhart and Jean-Marc Triscone, the Europhysics Prize of the Condensed Matter Division of the European Physical Society. In 2011 he was elected a fellow of American Physical Society.
