= Lanthanum ytterbium oxide =

Inorganic compound

Identifiers
3D model (JSmol)	Interactive image
PubChem CID	157548776
- InChI: InChI=1S/La.3O.Yb/q+3;3*-2;+3 Key: CDUHXVMRIAXWDH-UHFFFAOYSA-N
- SMILES: [La+3].[Yb+3].[O-2].[O-2].[O-2]

Properties
Chemical formula	LaYbO_{3}
Molar mass	359.9577 g/mol
Appearance	white powder
Density	8.08 g/cm^{3}

Related compounds
Other anions	Lanthanum aluminate Lanthanum manganite
- Except where otherwise noted, data are given for materials in their standard state (at 25 °C [77 °F], 100 kPa). Infobox references

Lanthanum ytterbium oxide is a solid inorganic compound of lanthanum, ytterbium and oxygen with the chemical formula of LaYbO_{3}. This compound adopts the perovskite structure.

== Synthesis ==
LaYbO_{3} is not a naturally occurring mineral but it can prepared by solid state reaction between La_{2}O_{3} and Yb_{2}O_{3} at temperatures around 1200 °C. Single-crystals of LaYbO_{3} can also be grown of a molten hydroxide flux at 750 °C in sealed silver tubes. Thin films of LaYbO_{3} have also been fabricated by pulsed laser deposition.

== Structure ==
LaYbO_{3} and other LaREO_{3} oxides (where RE=Ho, Y, Er, Tm, Yb, and Lu) compounds have an orthorhombic crystal structure with an internal symmetry described by the Pnma space group. The structure can be described by slightly distorted YbO_{6} octahedra tilted in the a−b+a− configuration according to Glazer's notation and antiparallel displaced La^{3+} ions. The rotation of the YbO_{6} octahedra reduces the coordination number of the La from 12 to 8. It exhibits a negative thermal expansion along the a and b axes.

== Physical properties ==
LaYbO_{3} exhibits a room-temperature permittivity, ɛ_{r}, of ~26, which decreases slightly to 25 at 10 K. LaYbO_{3} shows antiferromagnetic ordering with a weak ferromagnetism at 2.7 K. LaYbO_{3}-based perovskites are also known to show proton conductivity at intermediate temperatures (600-800 °C).
