= Calcium copper titanate =

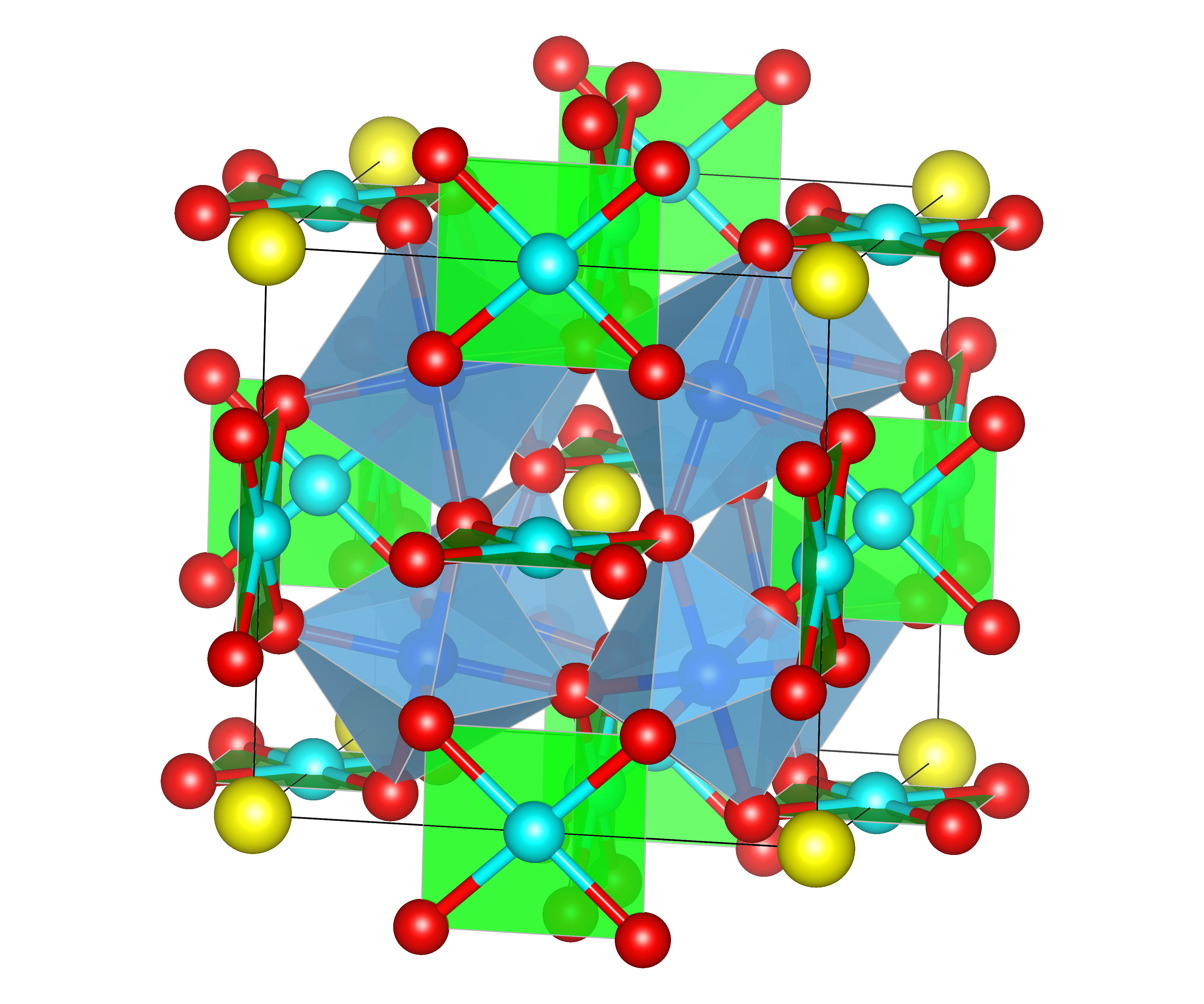
- CCTO

Identifiers
| CAS Number | 12336-91-3 |
| 3D model (JSmol) | Interactive image |
| CompTox Dashboard (EPA) | DTXSID001045982 |
- InChI: InChI=1S/Ca.3Cu.12O.4Ti/q4*+2;;;;;8*-1;;;; Key: WAAITMWVBUAGHE-UHFFFAOYSA-N
- SMILES: [Ca+2].[Cu+2].[Cu+2].[Cu+2].[O-][Ti](=O)[O-].[O-][Ti](=O)[O-].[O-][Ti](=O)[O-].[O-][Ti](=O)[O-]

Properties
| Chemical formula | CaCu_{3}Ti_{4}O_{12} |
| Molar mass | 614.1789 g/mol |
| Appearance | brown solid |
| Density | 4.7 g/cm^{3}, solid |
| Melting point | >1000 °C |

Structure
| Crystal structure | Cubic |
| Space group | Im3, No. 204 |
| Lattice constant | a = 7.391 Å |

Hazards
| NFPA 704 (fire diamond) | 1 0 0 |
| Safety data sheet (SDS) | External MSDS |
- Except where otherwise noted, data are given for materials in their standard state (at 25 °C [77 °F], 100 kPa). Infobox references

Calcium copper titanate (also abbreviated CCTO, for calcium copper titanium oxide) is an inorganic compound with the formula CaCu_{3}Ti_{4}O_{12}. It is noteworthy for its extremely large dielectric constant (effective relative permittivity) of over 10,000 at room temperature.

== History ==
CCTO was first synthesized in 1967 by Alfred Deschanvres and his coworkers. While the structural features were known, no physical properties had been measured. In 2000, Mas Subramanian and his colleagues at DuPont Central R&D discovered that CCTO displayed a dielectric constant greater than 10,000, compared to the normal dielectric SrTiO_{3}, which has a constant of 300 at room temperature. Since then, it has found widespread usage in capacitor applications.

== Synthesis and structure ==
Most compounds which form this crystal structure are made under high-pressure conditions. Pure CCTO, however, can be easily synthesized by standard solid state methods via intimate mixtures of the metal carbonate and oxide precursors at temperatures between 1000 and 1200 °C.

4TiO_{2} + CaCO_{3} + 3CuO → CaCu_{3}Ti_{4}O_{12} + CO_{2}

The CaCu_{3}Ti_{4}O_{12} structure type is derived from the cubic perovskite structure, by an octahedral tilting distortion as is GdFeO_{3}. In both cases the distortion is driven by a mismatch between the size of the A-cations and the cubic ReO_{3} network. However, CaCu_{3}Ti_{4}O_{12} and GdFeO_{3} adopt different patterns of octahedral tilting (a^{−}b^{+}a^{−} and a^{+}a^{+}a^{+} in Glazer notation). The octahedral tilting distortion associated with the GdFeO_{3} structure leads to a structure where all of the A-cation environments are identical. In contrast, the octahedral tilting distortion associated with the CaCu_{3}Ti_{4}O_{12} structure produces a structure where 75% of the A-cation sites (A" sites) have square planar coordination, while 25% of the A-cation sites remain 12 coordinate. The square planar sites are almost always filled by Jahn-Teller ion such as Cu^{2+} or Mn^{3+}, while the A' site is always occupied by a larger ion.

== Dielectric properties ==
Using the Clausius-Mossotti relation, the calculated intrinsic dielectric constant should be 49. However, CCTO exhibits a dielectric constant upwards of 10,200 at 1 MHz, with a moderate loss tangent until approximately 300 °C. In addition, the relative dielectric constant increases with decreasing frequency (in the range of 1 MHz to 1 kHz).

The colossal-dielectric phenomenon is attributed to a grain boundary (internal) barrier layer capacitance (IBLC) instead of an intrinsic property associated with the crystal structure. This barrier layer electrical microstructure with effective permittivity values in excess of 10, 000 can be fabricated by single-step processing in air at ~1100 °C. CCTO is therefore an attractive option to the currently used BaTiO_{3}-based materials which require complex, multistage processing routes to produce IBLCs of similar capacity.

Because there is a large discrepancy between the observed dielectric constant and the calculated intrinsic constant, the true origin of this phenomenon is still under debate.
