= Titanate =

Inorganic compounds composed of titanium oxides

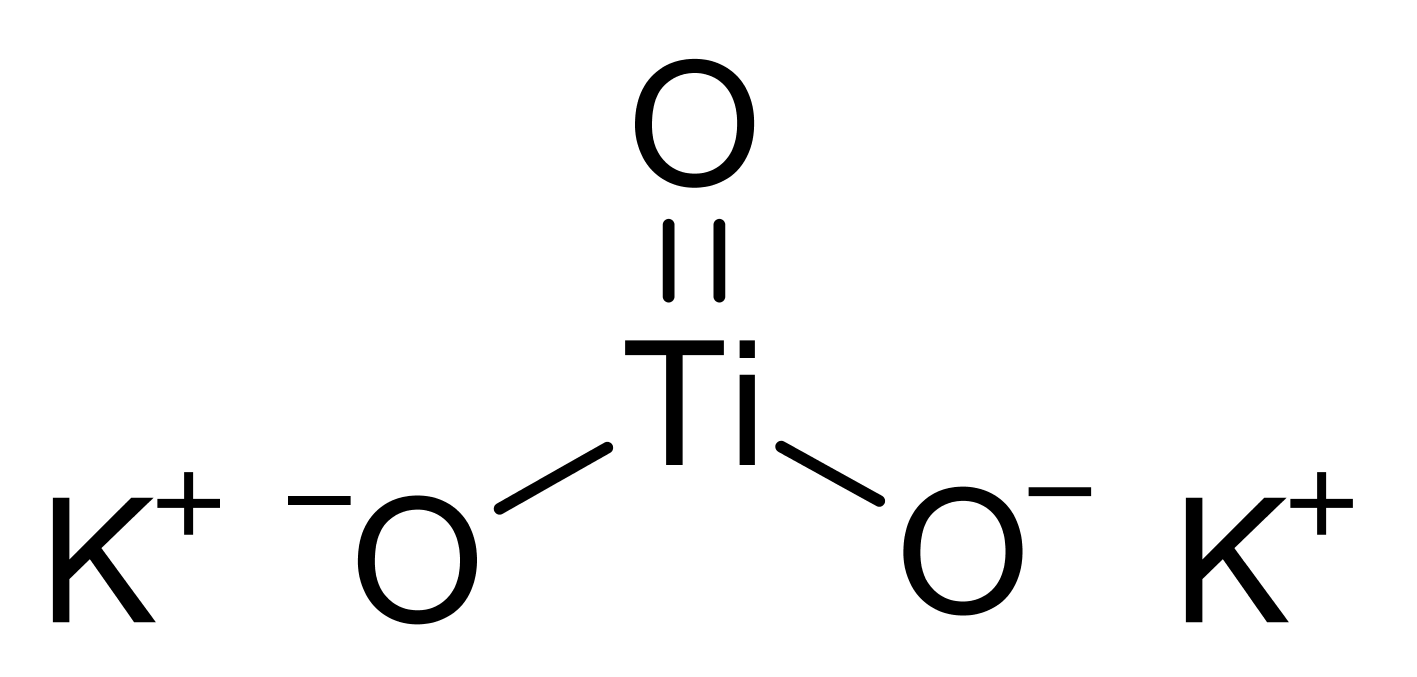
Potassium titanate (IV) chemical structure

In chemistry, titanate usually refers to inorganic compounds composed of titanium oxides, or oxides containing the titanium element. Together with niobate, titanate salts form the Perovskite group.

In some cases, the term is used more generally for any titanium-containing anion, e.g. [TiCl_{6}]^{2−} and [Ti(CO)_{6}]^{2−}. This article focuses on the oxides.

Many kinds of titanium oxides are known, and some are commercially important. Typically these materials are white, diamagnetic, high-melting, and insoluble in water. They are often prepared at high temperatures, e.g. using tube furnaces, from titanium dioxide. In virtually all cases, titanium achieves octahedral coordination geometry.

== Orthotitanates ==
Orthotitanates have the formula M_{2}TiO_{4}, where M is divalent. An example of such a material is magnesium titanate (Mg_{2}TiO_{4}), which adopts the spinel structure. Li_{2}TiO_{3} is not considered an orthotitanate since it adopts the rock-salt structure and does not feature an identifiable titanium anion. Orthotitanates almost never feature identifiable TiO_{4}^{4−} centres, an exception being Ba_{2}TiO_{4}.

=== Titanic acid and its esters ===
Also called orthotitanic acid or titanium hydroxide, the substance H_{4}TiO_{4} is called titanic acid. This material, which is not well defined, is obtained by hydrolysis of TiCl_{4}. The solid is unstable with respect to loss of water and formation of titanium dioxide. Esters of orthotitanic acid are known, however; one example being titanium isopropoxide. Esters derived from smaller alcohols adopt more complex structures wherein titanium does achieve octahedral coordination, e.g. Ti_{4}(OCH_{3})_{16} or titanium tetramethoxide. It is a weak acid, if it can be isolated.

== Metatitanates ==
The metatitanates have the formula MTiO_{3}, where again M is divalent. They do not feature discrete TiO_{3}^{2−} centres. Some, like the commercially important mineral ilmenite (FeTiO_{3}), crystallize in the hexagonal close packing motif seen in corundum. Alternatively, some materials with the formula MTiO_{3} crystallize in the motif known as perovskite, which is also the name of the mineral form of calcium titanate (CaTiO_{3}). Barium titanate is one such perovskite-structured titanate with ferroelectric properties.

== Perovskite titanates ==
Perovskite titanates are a family of titanates that crystallize in the perovskite structure, with the general formula ABO_{3}, where the B-site is occupied by Ti^{4+}. They constitute one of the most extensively studied classes of oxide materials owing to their wide range of electrical, magnetic, optical, and mechanical properties. The physical properties of these compounds can be strongly modified by chemical substitution, epitaxial strain, pressure, and temperature.

The mineral calcium titanate (CaTiO_{3}) is the archetypal perovskite and gives its name to the structure. Other common perovskite titanates include strontium titanate (SrTiO_{3}), barium titanate (BaTiO_{3}), lead titanate (PbTiO_{3}), and europium titanate (EuTiO_{3}).

=== Ferroelectric titanates ===
Several perovskite titanates exhibit ferroelectricity, in which a spontaneous electric polarization can be reversed by an applied electric field. Barium titanate undergoes a series of structural phase transitions upon cooling and is one of the most widely used ferroelectric ceramics in multilayer ceramic capacitors, actuators, and piezoelectric devices. Lead titanate possesses a larger spontaneous polarization and forms the basis of many technologically important solid solutions, including lead zirconate titanate (PZT).

=== Quantum paraelectrics ===
Strontium titanate is a quantum paraelectric that remains close to a ferroelectric instability down to absolute zero because of quantum fluctuations. It is widely used as a substrate for the epitaxial growth of oxide thin films and exhibits superconductivity when chemically doped or when oxygen deficient. Interfaces between SrTiO_{3} and other oxides, particularly lanthanum aluminate, have become model systems for studying two-dimensional electron gases and other emergent electronic phenomena.

=== Magnetic and correlated titanates ===
Rare-earth titanates such as gadolinium titanate, samarium titanate, and yttrium titanate are Mott insulators whose magnetic and electronic properties arise from strong electron correlations. Other titanates, including europium titanate, display strong coupling between their magnetic, dielectric, and structural properties and are studied as candidate multiferroic materials.

=== Applications ===
Perovskite titanates are used in capacitors, piezoelectric transducers, microwave resonators, electro-optic devices, thermistors, oxide electronics, and as substrates for the epitaxial growth of functional oxide thin films. They also serve as model materials in condensed matter physics for investigating ferroelectricity, superconductivity, metal–insulator transitions, and strongly correlated electron systems.

== Complex titanates ==
More complex titanates are also known, such as bismuth titanate, Bi_{4}Ti_{3}O_{12}.
