= LSAT (oxide) =

Names
- Other names lanthanum aluminate - strontium aluminium tantalate

Identifiers
3D model (JSmol)	Interactive image
PubChem CID	91865216
- InChI: InChI=1S/10Al.3La.47H2O.4O.14Sr.7Ta/h;;;;;;;;;;;;;47*1H2;;;;;;;;;;;;;;;;;;;;;;;;;/q;;;;;;;;;;;;;;;;;;;;;;;;;;;;;;;;;;;;;;;;;;;;;;;;;;;;;;;;;;;;;;2*-1;14*+2;;;;;;;/p-26 Key: HIPYJEIMBYUORH-UHFFFAOYSA-A
- SMILES: O.O.O.O.O.O.O.O.O.O.O.O.O.O.O.O.O.O.O.O.O.[OH-].[OH-].[OH-].[OH-].[OH-].[OH-].[OH-].[OH-].[OH-].[OH-].[OH-].[OH-].[OH-].[OH-].[OH-].[OH-].[OH-].[OH-].[OH-].[OH-].[OH-].[OH-].[OH-].[OH-].[OH-].[OH-].[O-][Ta](=O)([O-])O[Al].[Al].[Al].[Al].[Al].[Al].[Al].[Al].[Al].[Al].[Sr+2].[Sr+2].[Sr+2].[Sr+2].[Sr+2].[Sr+2].[Sr+2].[Sr+2].[Sr+2].[Sr+2].[Sr+2].[Sr+2].[Sr+2].[Sr+2].[La].[La].[La].[Ta].[Ta].[Ta].[Ta].[Ta].[Ta]

Properties
Chemical formula	(LaAlO_{3})_{0.3}(Sr_{2}TaAlO_{6})_{0.7}
Density	6.74 g/cm^{3}
Melting point	1,840 °C (3,340 °F; 2,110 K)
- Except where otherwise noted, data are given for materials in their standard state (at 25 °C [77 °F], 100 kPa). Infobox references

LSAT is the most common name for the inorganic compound lanthanum aluminate - strontium aluminium tantalate, which has the chemical formula (LaAlO_{3})_{0.3}(Sr_{2}TaAlO_{6})_{0.7} or its less common alternative: (La_{0.18}Sr_{0.82})(Al_{0.59}Ta_{0.41})O_{3}. LSAT is a hard, optically transparent oxide of the elements lanthanum, aluminium, strontium and tantalum. LSAT has the perovskite crystal structure, and its most common use is as a single crystal substrate for the growth of epitaxial thin films.

== Background ==
LSAT was originally developed as a substrate for the growth of high T_{c} cuprate superconductors thin films, mostly of yttrium barium copper oxide (YBCO), for microwave device applications. The motivation for its development was to create a lattice-matched substrate with a similar thermal expansion coefficient and no structural phase transition over a wide temperature range, spanning from the high temperatures used for the growth of cuprates, to the cryogenic temperatures where they are superconducting.

== Properties ==
LSAT has a Mohs hardness of 6.5, placing it between quartz and the mineral feldspar. Its relative dielectric constant is ~22 and it has a thermal expansion coefficient of 8~10×10^{−6}/K. The thermal conductivity of LSAT is 5.1 Wm^{−1}K^{−1}. LSAT's (cubic) lattice parameter of 3.868 Å makes it compatible for the growth of a wide range of perovskite oxides with a relatively low strain.

LSAT's melting temperature of 1,840C is lower compared to similar alternative substrates, such as LaAlO_{3}. This property enables the growth of LSAT single crystals using the Czochralski process (CZ), which has commercial advantages.

== Uses ==
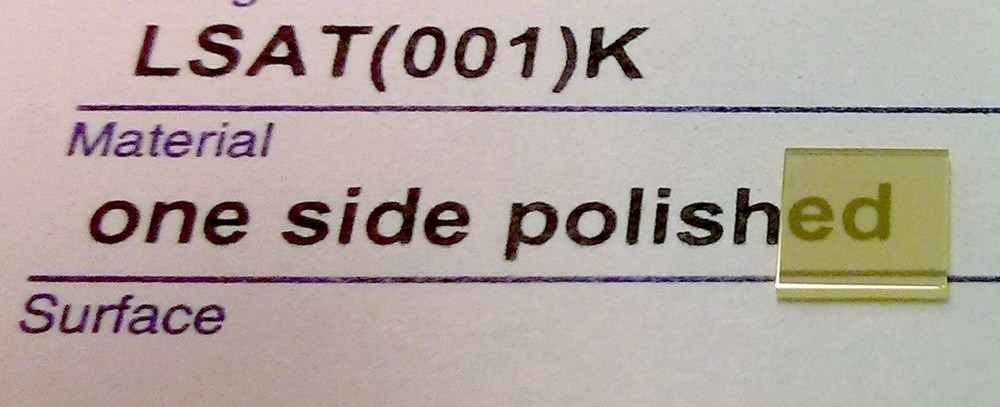
An LSAT single-crystal substrate (5x5x0.5 mm)

LSAT is primarily used in its single crystal form, typically as thin (≤1 mm) wafers. These wafers are used as a common substrate for epitaxial growth of thin films. LSAT substrates are popular for epitaxial oxides and their heterostructures, often in the study of electron correlation phenomena. Typical materials grown on LSAT substrates include strontium titanate (SrTiO_{3}), cuprate superconductors (such as YBCO), iron-based superconductors (iron-pnictides), rare-earth manganites, rare-earth nickelates and others. Semiconductors such as gallium nitride can also be grown on LSAT.

LSAT's usefulness as a substrate for the growth of such films stems from its high chemical and thermal stability, and very low electrical conductivity. The growth conditions for such epitaxial layers can cause some substrates to form high densities of defects that can alter their properties. One example is the tendency of strontium titanate to form oxygen vacancy defects under high temperatures in high vacuum. These defects result in considerable variations of its properties, including the increase of electrical conductivity and optical opacity. LSAT on the other hand, is stable in both oxidizing and fairly reducing environments in high temperatures, thus enabling a larger window for the processing and growth conditions.

== See also ==
- Epitaxial growth
- Electron correlation
- Strontium titanate
- Lanthanum aluminate
