= Heusler compound =

Type of metallic alloy

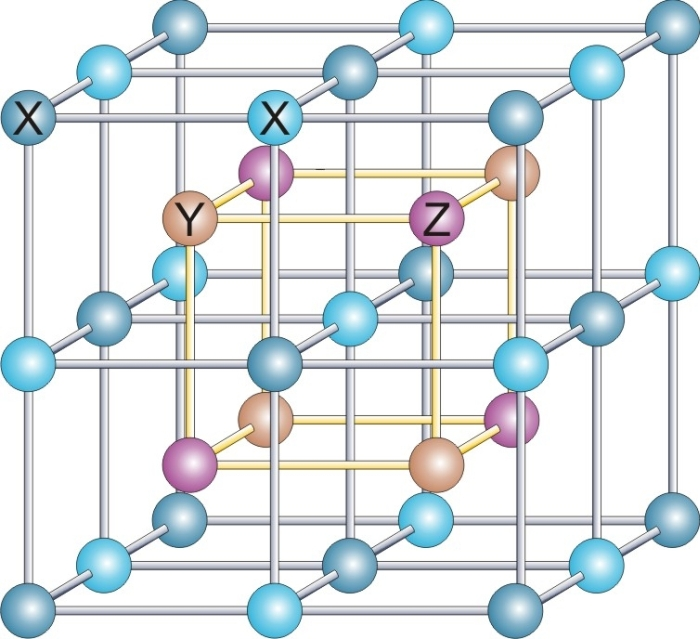
In the case of the full Heusler compounds with formula X_{2}YZ (e.g., Co_{2}MnSi) two of them are occupied by X atoms (L2_{1} structure); for the half-Heusler compounds XYZ one fcc sublattice remains unoccupied (C1_{b} structure).

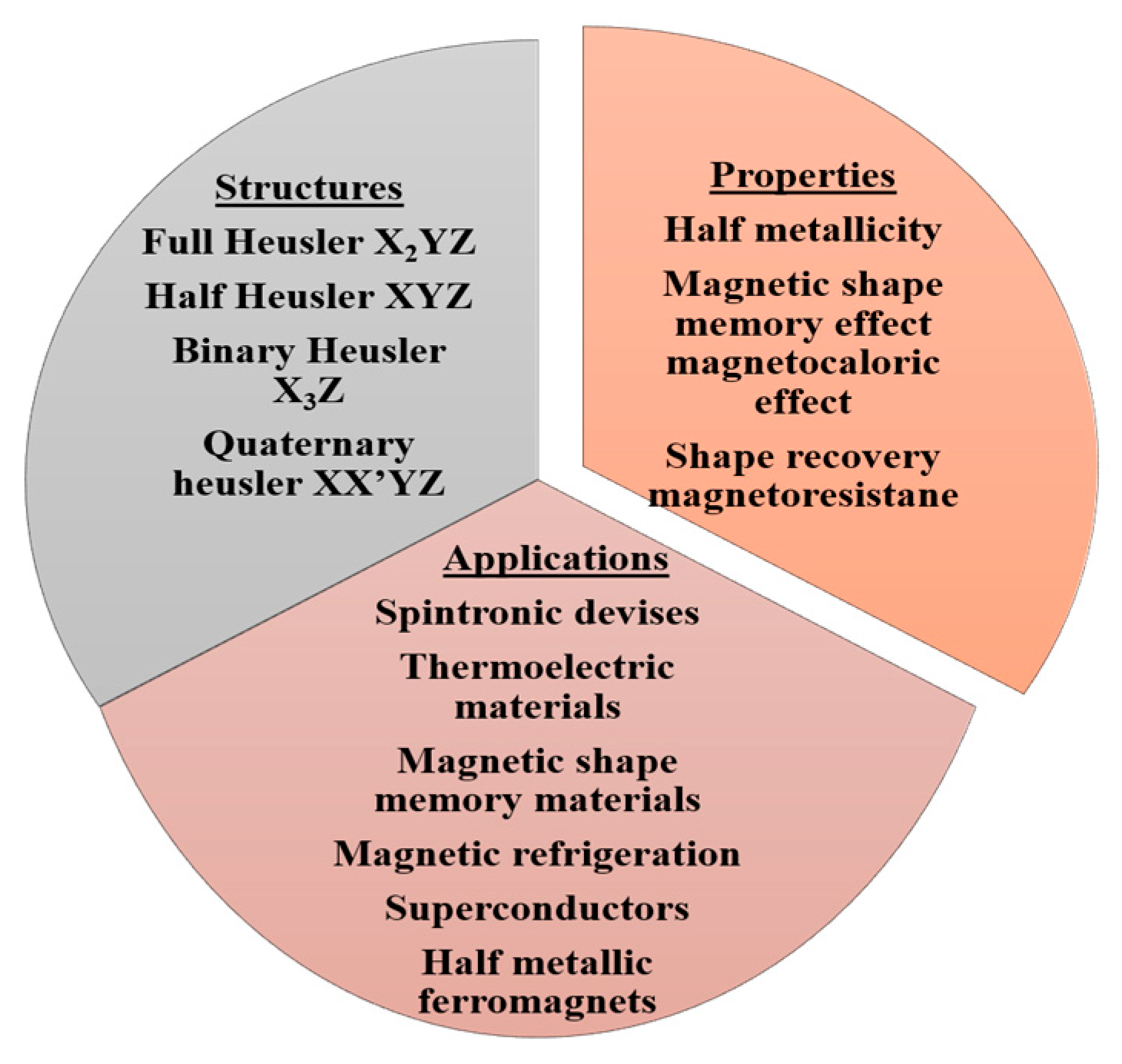
List of different structures, properties and possible applications of Heusler alloys.

Heusler compounds are magnetic intermetallics with face-centered cubic or body-centered tetragonal crystal structure and a composition of XYZ (half-Heuslers) or X_{2}YZ (full-Heuslers), where X and Y are transition metals and Z is in the p-block. The term derives from the name of German mining engineer and chemist Friedrich Heusler, who studied such a compound (Cu_{2}MnAl) in 1903. Many of these compounds exhibit properties relevant to spintronics, such as magnetoresistance, variations of the Hall effect, ferro-, antiferro-, and ferrimagnetism, half- and semimetallicity, semiconductivity with spin filter ability, superconductivity, topological band structure and are actively studied as thermoelectric materials. Their magnetism results from a double-exchange mechanism between neighboring magnetic ions. Manganese, which sits at the body centers of the cubic structure, was the magnetic ion in the first Heusler compound discovered. (See the Bethe–Slater curve for details of why this happens.)

== Styles of writing chemical formula ==
Depending on the field of literature being surveyed, one might encounter the same compound referred to with different chemical formulas. An example of the most common difference is X_{2}YZ versus XY_{2}Z, where the labels of the two transition metals X and Y in the compound are swapped. The traditional convention X_{2}YZ arises from the interpretation of Heuslers as intermetallics and is used predominantly in literature studying magnetic applications of Heuslers compounds. The XY_{2}Z convention on the other hand is used mostly in thermoelectric materials and transparent conducting applications literature where semiconducting Heuslers (most half-Heuslers are semiconductors) are used. This convention, in which the left-most element on the periodic table comes first, uses the Zintl interpretation of semiconducting compounds where the chemical formula XY_{2}Z is written in order of increasing electronegativity. In well-known compounds such as Fe_{2}VAl which were historically thought of as metallic (semi-metallic) but were more recently shown to be small-gap semiconductors one might find both styles being used. In the present article semiconducting compounds might sometimes be mentioned in the XY_{2}Z style.

== "Off-stoichiometric" Heuslers ==
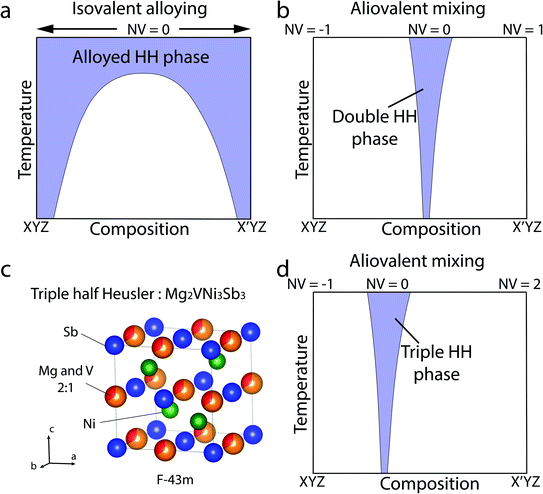
Phase diagrams sketches demonstrating how Double and Triple Half-Heusler compositions are different from traditional alloy compositions.

Although traditionally thought to form at compositions XYZ and X_{2}YZ, studies published after 2015 have discovered and reliably predicted Heusler compounds with atypical compositions such as XY_{0.8}Z and X_{1.5}YZ. Besides these ternary compositions, quaternary Heusler compositions called the double Half-Heusler X_{2}YY'Z_{2} (e.g. Ti_{2}FeNiSb_{2}) and triple Half-Heusler X_{2}X'Y_{3}Z_{3} (for e.g. Mg_{2}VNi_{3}Sb_{3}) have also been discovered. These "off-stoichiometric" (that is, differing from the well-known XYZ and X_{2}YZ compositions) Heuslers are mostly semiconductors in the low temperature T = 0 K limit. The stable compositions and corresponding electrical properties for these compounds can be quite sensitive to temperature and their order-disorder transition temperatures often occur below room-temperatures. Large amounts of defects at the atomic scale in off-stoichiometric Heuslers helps them achieve very low thermal conductivities and make them favorable for thermoelectric applications. The X_{1.5}YZ semiconducting composition is stabilized by the transition metal X playing a dual role (electron donor as well as acceptor) in the structure.

== Half-Heusler thermoelectrics ==
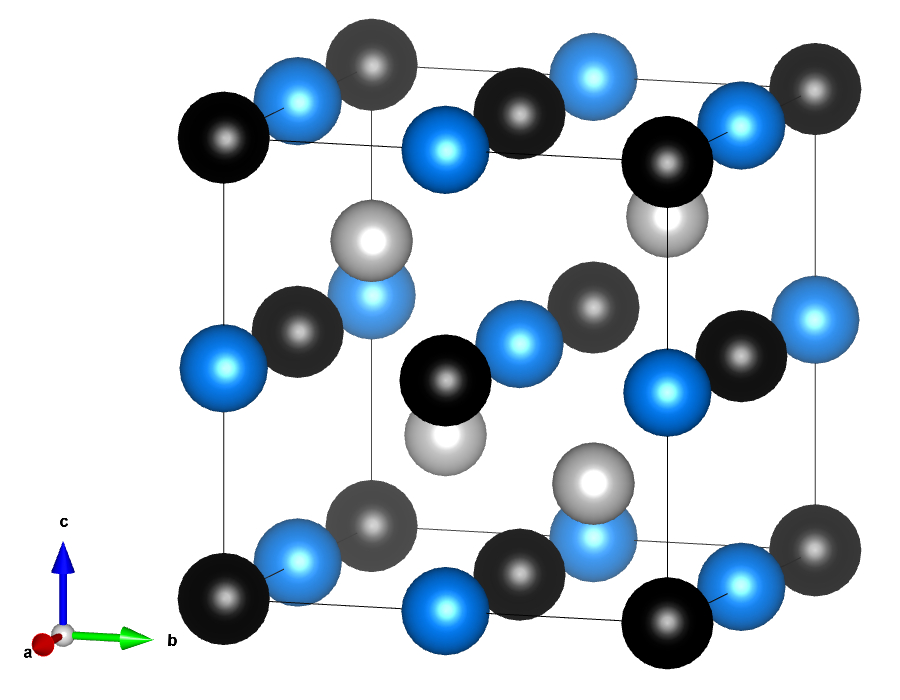
A schematic of a HH thermoelectric. X and Z have a larger electronegativity difference between them and form an NaCl-type ionic sublattice while Y and Z form a ZnS-type covalent sublattice

The half-Heusler compounds have distinctive properties and high tunability which makes the class very promising as thermoelectric materials. A study has predicted that there can be as many as 481 stable half-Heusler compounds using high-throughput ab initio calculation combine with machine learning techniques. The particular half-Heusler compounds of interest as thermoelectric materials (space group) are the semiconducting ternary compounds with a general formula XYZ where X is a more electropositive transition metal (such as Ti or Zr), Y is a less electropositive transition metal (such Ni or Co), and Z is heavy main group element (such as Sn or Sb). This flexible range of element selection allows many different combinations to form a half-Heusler phase and enables a diverse range of material properties.

Half-Heusler thermoelectric materials have distinct advantages over many other thermoelectric materials; low toxicity, inexpensive element, robust mechanical properties, and high thermal stability make half-Heusler thermoelectrics an excellent option for mid-high temperature application. However, the high thermal conductivity, which is intrinsic to highly symmetric HH structure, has made HH thermoelectric generally less efficient than other classes of TE materials. Many studies have focused on improving HH thermoelectric by reducing the lattice thermal conductivity and zT > 1 has been repeatedly recorded.

List of common half-Heusler compounds
p-type	n-type
MFeSb (M = V, Nb, Ta)	MCoSb (M = Ti, Zr, Hf)
ZrCoBi	MNiSn (M = Ti, Zr, Hf)
MCoSb (M = Ti, Zr, Hf)	M_{0.8}CoSb (M = V, Nb, Ta)

== Magnetic properties ==
The magnetism of the early full-Heusler compound Cu_{2}MnAl varies considerably with heat treatment and composition. It has a room-temperature saturation induction of around 8,000 gauss, which exceeds that of the element nickel (around 6100 gauss) but is smaller than that of iron (around 21500 gauss). For early studies see. In 1934, Bradley and Rogers showed that the room-temperature ferromagnetic phase was a fully ordered structure of the L2_{1} Strukturbericht type. This has a primitive cubic lattice of copper atoms with alternate cells body-centered by manganese and aluminium. The lattice parameter is 5.95 Å. The molten alloy has a solidus temperature of about 910 °C. As it is cooled below this temperature, it transforms into disordered, solid, body-centered cubic beta-phase. Below 750 °C, a B2 ordered lattice forms with a primitive cubic copper lattice, which is body-centered by a disordered manganese-aluminium sublattice. Cooling below 610 °C causes further ordering of the manganese and aluminium sub-lattice to the L2_{1} form. In non-stoichiometric alloys, the temperatures of ordering decrease, and the range of anealing temperatures, where the alloy does not form microprecipitates, becomes smaller than for the stoichiometric material.

Oxley found a value of 357 °C for the Curie temperature, below which the compound becomes ferromagnetic. Neutron diffraction and other techniques have shown that a magnetic moment of around 3.7 Bohr magnetons resides almost solely on the manganese atoms. As these atoms are 4.2 Å apart, the exchange interaction, which aligns the spins, is likely indirect and is mediated through conduction electrons or the aluminium and copper atoms.

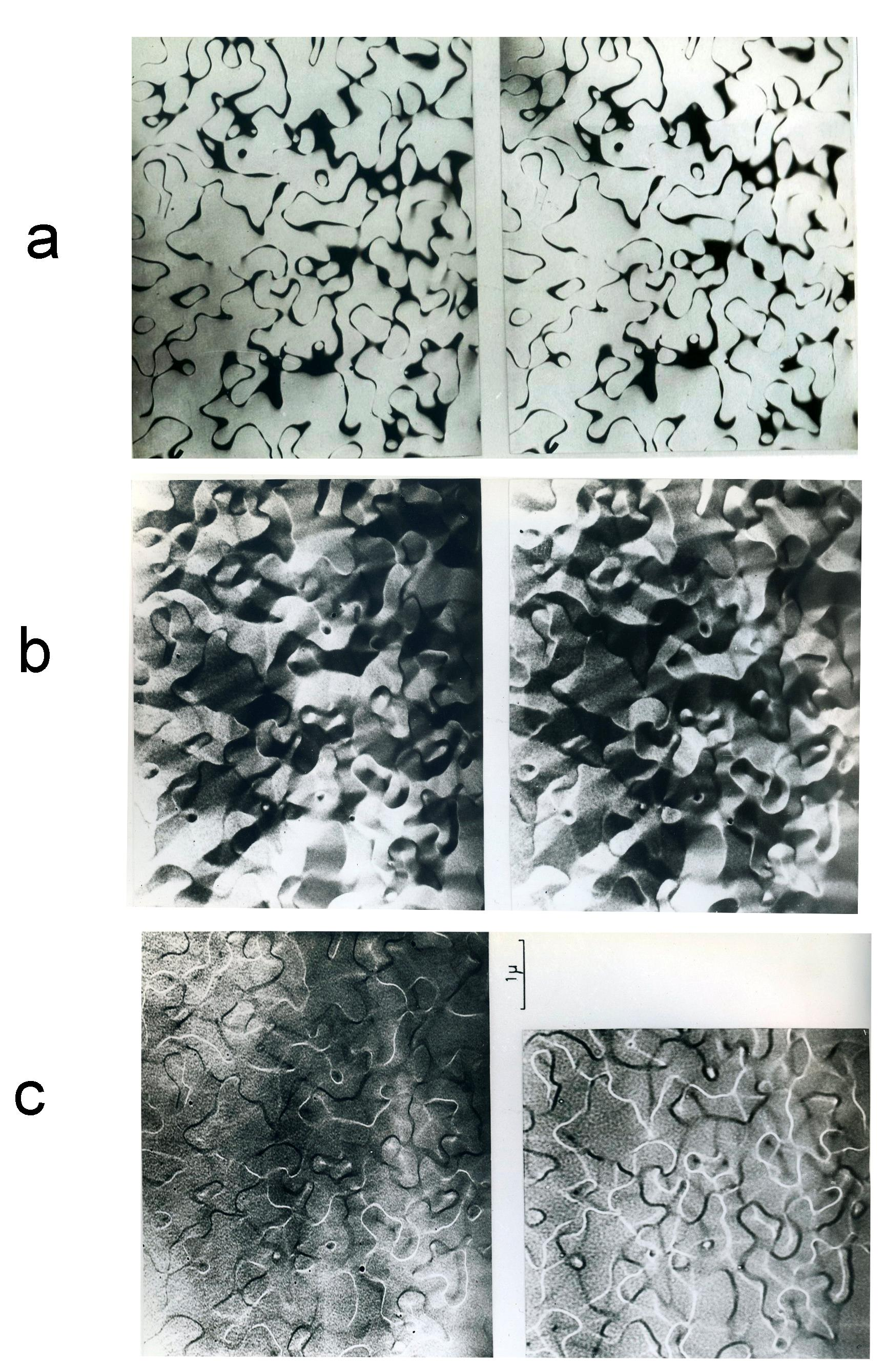
Electron microscope images of Cu-Mn-Al Heusler compound showing magnetic domain walls tied to APB's (a) L2_{1} antiphase boundaries by <111> dark-field imaging - the remaining micrographs are in bright-field so that the APB's are not in contrast (b) magnetic domains by Foucault (displaced aperture) imaging, and (c) magnetic domain walls by Fresnel (defocus) imaging.

Electron microscopy studies demonstrated that thermal antiphase boundaries (APBs) form during cooling through the ordering temperatures, as ordered domains nucleate at different centers within the crystal lattice and are often out of step with each other where they meet. The anti-phase domains grow as the alloy is annealed. There are two types of APBs corresponding to the B2 and L2_{1} types of ordering. APBs also form between dislocations if the alloy is deformed. At the APB the manganese atoms will be closer than in the bulk of the alloy and, for non-stoichiometric alloys with an excess of copper (e.g. Cu_{2.2}MnAl_{0.8}), an antiferromagnetic layer forms on every thermal APB. These antiferromagnetic layers completely supersede the normal magnetic domain structure and stay with the APBs if they are grown by annealing the alloy. This significantly modifies the magnetic properties of the non-stoichiometric alloy relative to the stoichiometric alloy which has a normal domain structure. Presumably this phenomenon is related to the fact that pure manganese is an antiferromagnet although it is not clear why the effect is not observed in the stoichiometric alloy. Similar effects occur at APBs in the ferromagnetic alloy MnAl at its stoichiometric composition.

Some Heusler compounds also exhibit properties of materials known as ferromagnetic shape-memory alloys. These are generally composed of nickel, manganese and gallium and can change their length by up to 10% in a magnetic field.

== Mechanical properties ==
Understanding the mechanical properties of Heusler compounds is paramount for temperature-sensitive applications (e.g. thermoelectrics) for which some sub-classes of Heusler compounds are used. However, experimental studies are rarely encountered in literature. In fact, the commercialization of these compounds is limited by the material's ability to undergo intense, repetitive thermal cycling and resist cracking from vibrations. An appropriate measure for crack resistance is the material's toughness, which typically scales inversely with another important mechanical property: the mechanical strength. In this section, we highlight existing experimental and computational studies on the mechanical properties of Heusler alloys. Note that the mechanical properties of such a compositionally-diverse class of materials is expectedly dependent on the chemical composition of the alloys themselves, and therefore trends in mechanical properties are difficult to identify without a case-by-case study.

The elastic modulus values of half-Heusler alloys range from 83 to 207 GPa, whereas the bulk modulus spans a tighter range from 100 GPa in HfNiSn to 130 GPa in TiCoSb. A collection of various density functional theory (DFT) calculations show that half-Heusler compounds are predicted to have a lower elastic, shear, and bulk modulus than in quaternary-, full-, and inverse-Hausler alloys. DFT also predicts a decrease in elastic modulus with temperature in Ni_{2}XAl (X=Sc, Ti, V), as well as an increase in stiffness with pressure. The decrease in modulus with respect to temperature is also observed in TiNiSn, ZrNiSn, and HfNiSn, where ZrNiSn has the highest modulus and Hf has the lowest. This phenomenon can be explained by the fact that the elastic modulus decreases with increasing interatomic separation: as temperature increases, the atomic vibrations also increase, resulting in a larger equilibrium interatomic separation.

The mechanical strength is also rarely studied in Heusler compounds. One study has shown that, in off-stoichiometric Ni_{2}MnIn, the material reaches a peak strength of 475 MPa at 773 K, which drastically reduces to below 200 MPa at 973 K. In another study, a polycrystalline Heusler alloy composed of the Ni-Mn-Sn ternary composition space was found to possess a peak compressive strength of about 2000 MPa with plastic deformation up to 5%. However, the addition of Indium to the Ni-Mn-Sn ternary alloy not only increases the porosity of the samples, but it also reduces the compressive strength to 500 MPa. It is unclear from the study what percentage of the porosity increase from the indium addition reduces the strength. Note that this is opposite to the outcome expected from solid solution strengthening, where adding indium to the ternary system slows dislocation movement through dislocation-solute interaction and subsequently increases the material's strength.

The fracture toughness can also be tuned with composition modifications. For example, the average toughness of Ti_{1−x}(Zr, Hf)_{x}NiSn ranges from 1.86 MPa m^{1/2} to 2.16 MPa m^{1/2}, increasing with Zr/Hf content. The preparation of samples may affect the measured fracture toughness however, as elaborated by O'Connor et al. In their study, samples of Ti_{0.5}Hf_{0.5}Co_{0.5}Ir_{0.5}Sb_{1−x}Sn_{x} were prepared using three different methods: a high-temperature solid state reaction, high-energy ball milling, and a combination of both. The study found higher fracture toughness in samples prepared without a high-energy ball milling step of 2.7 MPa m^{1/2} to 4.1 MPa m^{1/2}, as opposed to samples that were prepared with ball milling of 2.2 MPa m^{1/2} to 3.0 MPa m^{1/2}. Fracture toughness is sensitive to inclusions and existing cracks in the material, so it is as expected dependent on the sample preparation.

== Half-metallic ferromagnetic Heusler compounds ==
Half-metallic ferromagnets exhibit a metallic behavior in the majority spin channel and an insulating behavior (a band gap) in the minority spin channel. The first example of Heusler half-metallic ferromagnets was first investigated by de Groot et al., with the case of NiMnSb, a half Heusler compound. In NiMnSb, there is a gap at the Fermi level located in the minority spin-band. The gap comes from the stable hybridization between the d sates higher valence transition atom (Ni) and lower valence transition atoms (Mn), promoting the establishment of bonding and antibonding bands with a gap between them. The bonding band is developed by the atom with the higher valence electrons, while the antibonding state is formed by a lower valence electron atom. Half-metallicity leads to the full polarization of the conducting electrons. Half metallic ferromagnets are therefore promising for spintronics applications.

Heusler compunds obey the Slater-Pauling rule, which connectes the total magnetic moment per formula unit (M) to the number of valence electrons (N_{v}). As mentioned above, there is a band gap in the minority-spin (↓) channel. All ↓ states below this gap form a fixed set of bonding and nonbonding orbitals that accommodate a constant number of electrons, N_{↓}, which is approximately 3/atom. Any extra valence electrons beyond N_{↓} must enter the ↑ channel, boosting its occupancy one electron at a time.

Therefore, we have total valence electrons N_{v} split into spin populations: N_{v} = N_{↑} + N_{↓}.

And for the net magnetic moment per formula unit: M=N_{↑}−N_{↓}.

Also, since N_{↓} is fixed by the gap, M grows linearly with N_{v}: M= N_{v} − 2N_{↓}.

For a full Heusler compound, N_{↓} = 2×3×4 (4 atoms) = 24, so we have: M = N_{v}−24;

For a half Heusler compound, N_{↓} = 2×3×3 (3 atoms) = 18, so we have: M = N_{v}−18.

If this relationship is satisfied exactly and the calculated electronic structure shows a bandgap in one spin channel, the compound is a candidate half-metal. Deviations from the Slater–Pauling rule often indicates defects.

== Catalytic application ==
Heusler compounds could also serve as ideal catalysts. First, they offer a large number of possible elemental combinations, providing great opportunities for discovering high-performance catalysts. Second, their constituent elements can be partially replaced by other elements, which is useful for tuning catalytic properties by controlling the electronic structures and modifying the surface composition. Takayuki K. et al. investigated the catalytic properties of various Heusler alloys for the hydrogenation of propyne and the oxidation of carbon monoxide. They found that for propyne hydrogenation, Co_{2}FeGe alloy exhibited a higher activity than elemental Co, while neither Fe nor Ge showed any activity, which they attributed to the alloying effect. For carbon monoxide oxidation, they found that Co_{2}TiSn alloy possessed excellent stability during the repeated experiments, indicating that the catalytic activity and stability of a Heusler alloy can be adjusted by selecting an appropriate combination of elements.

== Synthesis of Heusler alloys ==
=== Bulk/solid-state synthesis methods ===
1. Arc or induction melting: Constituent elements are melted together under controlled atmosphere to get homogeneity. Constituent elements are melted together under controlled atmosphere to get homogeneity.
2. Rapid solidification: Melt is ejected and rapidly cooled on a spinning wheel, giving ribbons or thin strips. High cooling rates produce finer grains, perhaps high metastability, suppress some phase segregations.
3. Electrodeposition: Less common but used, especially for thin films or coatings. The composition can be tuned via deposition potential, etc. E.g. Co_{2}FeSn Heusler alloy via electrodeposition.

=== Thin-film/deposition methods ===
1. Co-sputtering: Frequently used. Films deposited at room or elevated substrate temperature, followed by annealing to increase structural ordering.
2. Molecular-beam epitaxy: Provides high purity, good control over stoichiometry, layering, ability to grow epitaxial films.
3. Pulsed laser deposition: Allows co‑deposition, control; stoichiometrically accurate; smooth surface morphology and decent crystalline structure.

== List of notable Heusler compounds ==
- Cu_{2}MnAl, Cu_{2}MnIn, Cu_{2}MnSn
- Ni_{2}MnAl, Ni_{2}MnIn, Ni_{2}MnSn, Ni_{2}MnSb, Ni_{2}MnGa
- Co_{2}MnAl, Co_{2}MnSi, Co_{2}MnGa, Co_{2}MnGe, Co_{2}NiGa, Co_{2}MnSn
- Pd_{2}MnAl, Pd_{2}MnIn, Pd_{2}MnSn, Pd_{2}MnSb
- Co_{2}FeSi, Co_{2}FeAl
- Fe_{2}VAl
- Mn_{2}VGa, Co_{2}FeGe
- Co_{2}Cr_{x}Fe_{1−x}X (X = Al, Si)
- YbBiPt
