= Tungsten ditelluride =

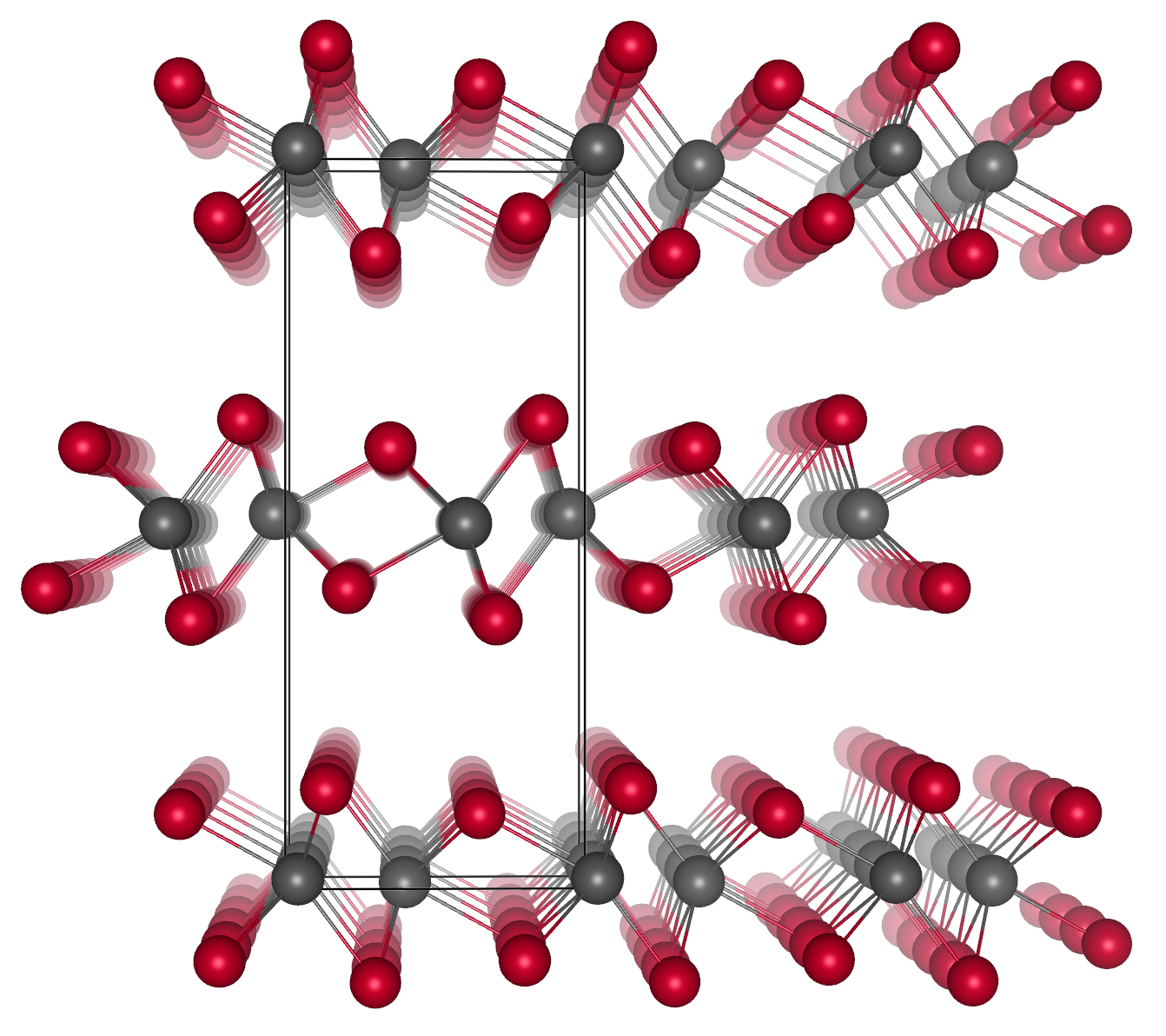

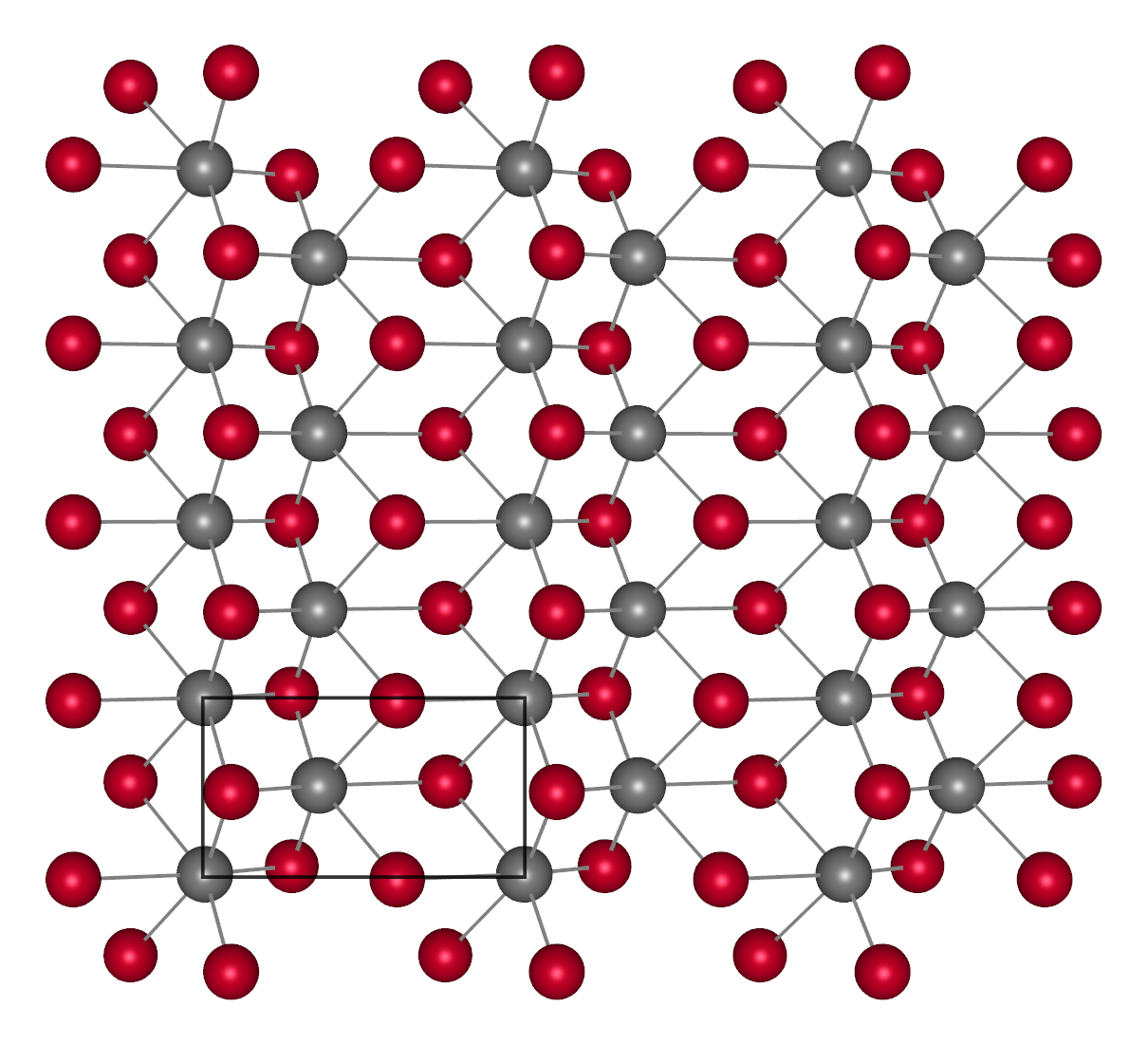
- Top: Crystal structure of WTe_{2}. Bottom: Single layer of WTe_{2} viewed from above. (W:gray, Te:red)

Names
- Other names tungsten ditelluride

Identifiers
CAS Number	12067-76-4
3D model (JSmol)	Interactive image
ChemSpider	74813
ECHA InfoCard	100.031.884
EC Number	235-086-0
PubChem CID	82913
CompTox Dashboard (EPA)	DTXSID3065243
- InChI: InChI=1S/2Te.W Key: WFGOJOJMWHVMAP-UHFFFAOYSA-N
- SMILES: [Te]=[W]=[Te]

Properties
Chemical formula	WTe_{2}
Molar mass	439.04 g/mol
Appearance	gray crystals
Density	9.43 g/cm^{3}, solid
Melting point	1,020 °C (1,870 °F; 1,290 K)
Solubility in water	negligible
Solubility	insoluble in ammonia

Structure
Crystal structure	orthorhombic, oP12
Space group	Pmn2_{1}, No. 31
Lattice constant	a = 3.50 Å, b = 6.34 Å, c = 15.4 Å
- Except where otherwise noted, data are given for materials in their standard state (at 25 °C [77 °F], 100 kPa). verify (what is ?) Infobox references

Tungsten ditelluride (WTe_{2}) is an inorganic semimetallic chemical compound. In October 2014, tungsten ditelluride was discovered to exhibit an extremely large magnetoresistance: 13 million percent resistance increase in a magnetic field of 60 tesla at 0.5 kelvin. The resistance is proportional to the square of the magnetic field and shows no saturation. This may be due to the material being the first example of a compensated semimetal, in which the number of mobile holes is the same as the number of electrons. Tungsten ditelluride has layered structure, similar to many other transition metal dichalcogenides, but its layers are so distorted that the honeycomb lattice many of them have in common is in WTe_{2} hard to recognize. The tungsten atoms instead form zigzag chains, which are thought to behave as one-dimensional conductors. Unlike electrons in other two-dimensional semiconductors, the electrons in WTe_{2} can easily move between the layers.

When subjected to pressure, the magnetoresistance effect in WTe_{2} is reduced. Above the pressure of 10.5 GPa magnetoresistance disappears and the material becomes a superconductor. At 13.0 GPa the transition to superconductivity happens below 6.5 K.

WTe_{2} was predicted to be a Weyl semimetal and, in particular, to be the first example of a Type II Weyl semimetal, where the Weyl nodes exist at the intersection of the electron and hole pockets.

It has also been reported that terahertz-frequency light pulses can switch the crystal structure of WTe_{2} between orthorhombic and monoclinic by altering the material's atomic lattice.

Tungsten ditelluride can be exfoliated into thin sheets down to single layers. Monolayer WTe_{2} was initially predicted to remain a Weyl semimetal in the 1T' crystal phase. It was later shown with transport measurements that, below 50K, a single layer of WTe_{2} instead acts like an insulator but with an offset current independent of doping by a local electrostatic gate. When using a contact geometry that shorted out conduction along the device edges, this offset current vanished, demonstrating that this nearly quantized conduction was localized to the edge—behavior consistent with monolayer WTe_{2} being a two-dimensional topological insulator. Identical measurements with two- and three-layer thick samples showed the expected semimetallic response. Subsequent studies using other techniques have been consistent with the transport results, including those using angle-resolved photoemission spectroscopy and microwave-impedance microscopy. Monolayer WTe_{2} has also been observed to superconduct at moderate doping, with a critical temperature tunable by doping level.

Two- and three-layer thick WTe_{2} have also been observed to be polar metals, simultaneously hosting metallic behavior and switchable electric polarization. The polarization was theorized to originate from vertical charge transfer between the layers, which is switched by interlayer sliding.
