= Friedrich Heusler =

German mining engineer and chemist (1866–1947)

- Born: 1 February 1866; Dillenburg, Germany
- Died: 25 October 1947 (aged 81)
- Education: University of Berlin, University of Bonn
- Scientific career
- Fields: inorganic chemistry, metallurgy
- Workplaces: University of Göttingen, Isabellenhütte Heusler

Carl Ludwig David Friedrich Heusler (1 February 1866, Dillenburg – 25 October 1947) was a German mining engineer, chemist and metallurgist. He discovered a special group of intermetallic alloys now known as Heusler alloys, which are ferromagnetic though the constituting elements are not ferromagnetic.

== Biography ==
He was born as son of Conrad Heusler the owner of the Isabellenhütte Dillenburg, a non-ferrous metal works. He studied at the University of Bonn and University of Berlin and was awarded with his Ph.D. in 1887 in Berlin. After working at the University of Göttingen he did his habilitation in Berlin 1894. In 1901 he discovered the ferromagnetic intermetallics, now known as Heusler phases, and did some research in collaboration with the University of Marburg. Due to patent controversies it took until 1903 for the publication of the results. From 1902 he was head of the Isabellenhütte.
