= Mas Subramanian =

Indian chemist

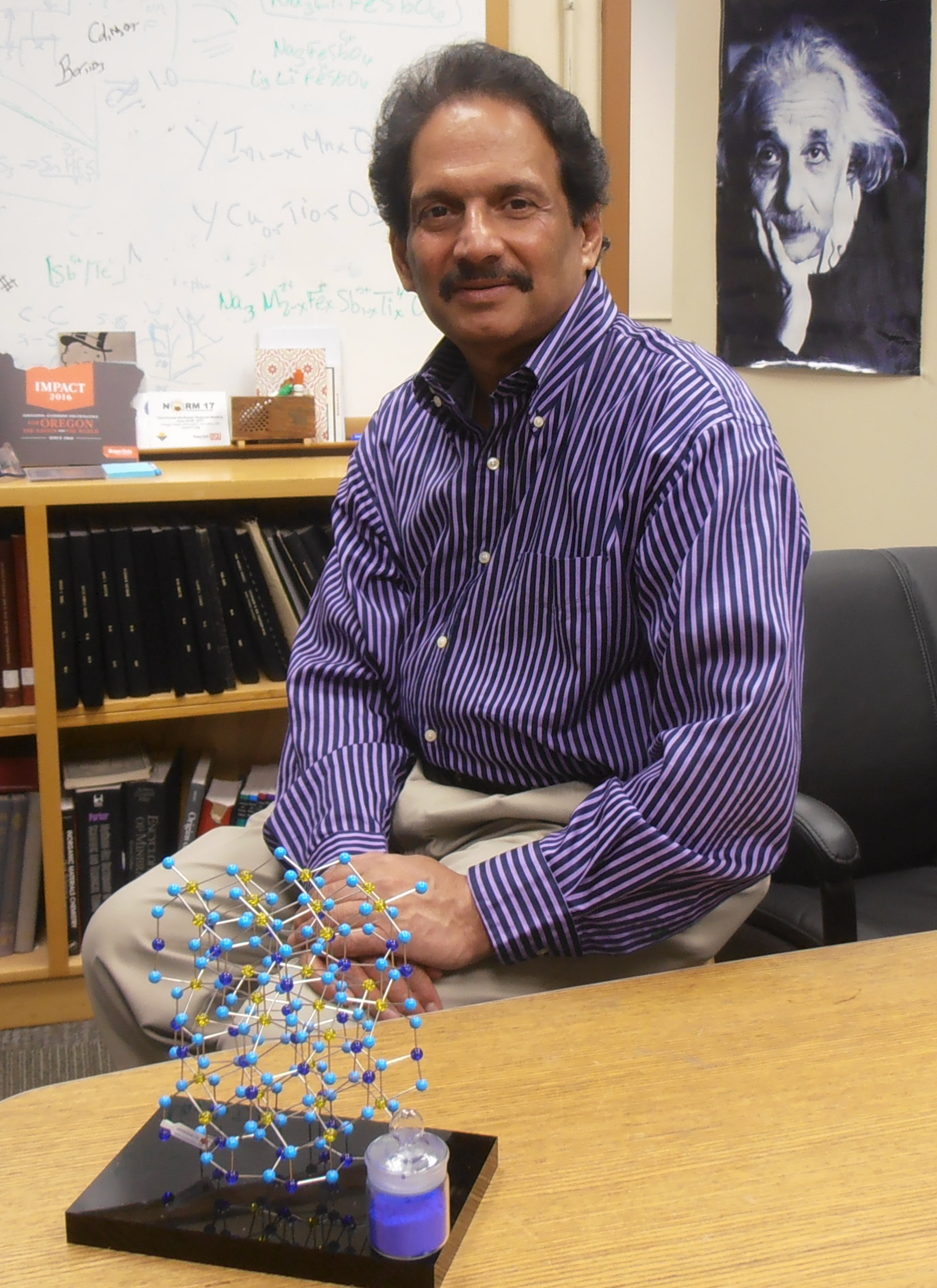
- Born: Munirpallam A. Subramanian; 1954 (age 71–72); Chennai, Tamil Nadu, India
- Other names: M.A. Subramanian, Mas Subramanian
- Education: University of Madras (B.S., M.S., 1972-1977); IIT Madras (Ph.D., 1982)
- Scientific career
- Fields: Chemistry, materials science
- Workplaces: DuPont (Wilmington, DE) (1984–2006); Institut de Chimie de la Matière Condensée de Bordeaux (Bordeaux, France) (visits, 1993–2006); Oregon State University (Corvallis, OR) (2006 – present); Laboratoire CRISMAT (Caen, France) (visits, 2007–2009)

Mas Subramanian (born 1954) is a solid-state materials scientist at Oregon State University in Corvallis, Oregon. He is a University Distinguished Professor and the Milton Harris Chair of Materials Science in the university's Department of Chemistry. His work in solid-state chemistry on structure-property relationships of inorganic compounds has led to several new functional materials, many of which have found usage in various applications. Subramanian has authored 400+ research publications and holds 84 patents. His publications have received more than 37,000 citations (h-index: 84).

== Early life and education ==
Subramanian was born and raised in Chennai, India. Subramanian received his B.S. in chemistry from the University of Madras, in 1975 and received a M.S. in inorganic chemistry from the same university in 1977. In his master's thesis Subramanian analyzed various minerals and alloys. In 1982 he completed his Ph.D. in solid state chemistry on pyrochlore oxides at the Indian Institute of Technology, Madras, India, under the guidance of G. V. Subba Rao. The introduction to his thesis is a pyrochlore review that remains his most cited work. From 1982 to 1984, he was a NSF Post Doctoral Fellow under the guidance of Abraham Clearfield at Texas A&M University, College Station, Texas.

== Scientific career ==
In 1984, Subramanian joined the Central R&D department at the DuPont Experimental Station in Wilmington, Delaware, eventually becoming a DuPont Research Fellow in 2002. He has contributed to the fields of ceramics, superconductors, dielectrics, catalysis, thermoelectrics, multiferroics, ionic conductors, and organic synthesis. His notable discoveries include: zeolites as precursors to electronic ceramics, new Bi and Tl-containing superconductors, catalysts for Fischer-Tropsch synthesis, and hydrofluorocarbons (HFCs), colossal dielectrics (CCTO), colossal magnetoresistance (GMR) oxides, and skutterudite thermoelectrics. He has worked on the synthesis of fluoroaromatic compounds.

In 2006, Subramanian joined Oregon State University as the Milton Harris Chair Professor of Materials Science, where his research is dedicated to the design and synthesis of novel functional materials for emerging applications in energy, environment, and electronics. He and his team, at Oregon State University, work on various topics such as pigments, thermoelectrics, high-temperature superconductivity, magnetoresistivity, solid fast ion conductors, high-K dielectrics, and topological insulators. In 2009, his team discovered a novel durable blue pigment, YInMn Blue, the first discovery of a new inorganic blue pigment since Cobalt blue was discovered in 1802. Subramanian has given numerous public lectures all over the world on YInMn Blue, including TEDxSalem and TEDxUNC. This discovery has been featured in various international media outlets (such as The New York Times, TIME, National Geographic, Smithsonian, Bloomberg Businessweek, and WBUR), and has attracted global attention from corporations and museums, like Nike, Crayola, and the Harvard Art Museum. In June 2021, Subramanian provided YInMn Blue to Sir Martyn Poliakoff for use in the Periodic Videos educational web series.

Subramanian has served as a member of the editorial board for the Journal of Materials Chemistry (1995–2001), Chemistry of Materials (2000–2006), Materials Research Bulletin (2006–present), and the Journal of Solid State Chemistry (2009–present), and is continues to serve as an editor for two international academic journals, Solid State Sciences, and Progress in Solid State Chemistry.

== Honors and awards ==
- C.N.R. Rao Award (International), Chemical Research Society of India, 2026
- American Chemical Society National Award in Inorganic Chemistry, 2025
- Elected Fellow, Neutron Scattering Society of America (NSSA), 2024
- University Distinguished Professor, Oregon State University, 2019
- Perkin Medal (awarded in exceptional circumstances) from the Society of Dyers and Colourists, 2019
- Elected Fellow, The American Association for the Advancement of Science (AAAS), 2018
- Distinguished Alumnus Award, IIT Madras, 2018
- Oregon Academy of Science Outstanding Oregon Scientist, 2016
- F.A. Gilfillan Memorial Award for Distinguished Scholarship in Science (OSU), 2013
- National Science Foundation (NSF) Creativity Award, 2012
- Chemical Research Society of India (CRSI) Medal, 2012
- Gordon Research Conference (GRC) Hall of Fame, 2011
- Chair of the Gordon Research Conference on Solid State Chemistry, 2010
- Ralf Busch Materials Science Award, OSU (2007)
- Chair of Excellence, CRISMAT, Caen, France, (2006–2008)
- Signature Faculty Fellow, Oregon Nanoscience and Microtechnologies Institute (ONAMI), 2006–present
- DuPont Charles Pedersen Medal Award for Excellence in Scientific and Technical Achievement, 2004
