= Earl D. Shaw =

African American physicist and laser scientist

Earl David Shaw
- Born: 26 November 1937 (age 88); Clarksdale, Mississippi
- Education: University of Illinois; Dartmouth College; University of California, Berkeley
- Scientific career
- Workplaces: Bell Labs; Rutgers University
- Thesis: Nuclear relaxation in ferromagnetic cobalt (1969)
- Doctoral advisor: Alan M. Portis

Earl David Shaw (born 26 November 1937) is an American physicist and professor, known for his work in laser science and developing laser technology. He is credited as the co-founder of the spin-flip Raman tunable laser.

== Early life and education ==
Earl David Shaw was born in 1937 in Clarksdale, Mississippi. Both of his parents worked as sharecroppers, and Shaw grew up on Hopson Plantation near Clarksdale, where he attended primary school in a three-room schoolhouse. At age twelve, he and his mother moved to Chicago, Illinois, where he attended high school at Crane Technical High School.

Shaw attended the University of Illinois for his undergraduate studies, and received a bachelor's degree in physics in 1960.

After completing his undergraduate studies, he moved to Hanover, New Hampshire, to work as a lab technician for the U.S. Army Corps of Engineers. He then enrolled in and received a master's degree in physics from Dartmouth College, and a PhD in physics from the University of California, Berkeley, in 1969. While at Berkeley, Shaw was president of the Black Student Union and participated in the student movement at the university.

His thesis, published in October 1969, was titled "Nuclear relaxation in ferromagnetic cobalt," and his doctoral advisor was Alan M. Portis. His doctoral studies were support by the U. S. Atomic Energy Commission.

== Career ==
After completing his doctoral studies, Shaw began work as a research scientist at Bell Labs in Morristown, New Jersey, in an experimental group led by C. Kumar N. Patel. Shaw was the first African American research physicist hired by the company. While at Bell Labs, Shaw co-founded the spin-flip Raman tunable laser. He remained at Bells Labs for 19 years and also served on the faculty of the University of Rochester during a three year hiatus from the company.

In 1991, Shaw joined the faculty of Rutgers University in Newark, New Jersey. Shaw helped bring new laser technology to the university that was developed at Bell Labs. The far-infrared free electron laser was operational at Rutgers by 1999 and was used to study the time dependence of the vibrational motion of DNA and other biological molecules. In 1999, Shaw and student Charles Kopec worked together to bring a telescope to the Rutgers campus, which was used by students and faculty from Rutgers and the New Jersey Institute of Technology; scientists from the Newark Museum planetarium; and in summer programs for Newark high school students. Shaw has also served as the physics department chairperson.

Shaw was a 1989 American Physical Society Fellow, cited for "contributions to the development of infrared lasers, specifically the spin-flip Raman laser, and for his leadership in the education and advising of minority students and scientists." He was nominated by the APS Division of Condensed Matter Physics. He has also been a member of the National Society of Black Physicists during his career.

== Personal life ==
Shaw has been married twice, and has three children. His son is the computer scientist Alan C. Shaw.
