= Nai Phuan Ong =

American experimental physicist

- Born: October 10, 1948 (age 77); Penang, Malaysia
- Education: Columbia University (BA); University of California, Berkeley (PhD)
- Scientific career
- Fields: Experimental physics
- Workplaces: University of Southern California; Princeton University
- Doctoral students: Harold Y. Hwang

Nai Phuan Ong (born 10 September 1948 in Penang, Malaysia) is an American experimental physicist, specializing in "condensed matter physics focusing on topological insulators, Dirac/Weyl semimetals, superconductors and quantum spin liquids."

== Biography ==
Nai Phuan Ong was born in Penang, Malaysia to parents of Chinese origin on 10 September 1948. He grew up speaking a Chinese dialect with his parents and English with his seven siblings. As a youth, he attended Saint Xaviers Institution, run by the Christian Brothers, where classes were taught in English. His interest in science was spurred by his sister's library books; he started going to the library himself at the age of ten and read books about science and airplanes, fascinated to learn how they fly. He started building toy airplanes and copying drawings of turbine blades and pistons in jet engines.

Ong immigrated to the United States with his family in 1967. He won a scholarship to Columbia College, the oldest undergraduate college of Columbia University, and graduated from there in 1971 with a B.A. in physics. He went on to complete a Ph.D., in 1976, under the direction of Alan Portis, from the University of California, Berkeley. At the University of Southern California, Ong was an assistant professor from 1976 to 1982, an associate professor 1982 to 1984, and a full professor in 1985. He joined the faculty at Princeton University as the first Asian professor in 1985. In 2003, he was appointed to the Eugene Higgins Professorship of Physics, which he continues to hold. Ong was a member of the editorial board of the journal Science from January 2012 to February 2014.

He has been the advisor for many doctoral students, including Harold Y. Hwang, and many post-docs, including Kathryn Moler.

In 1982 Ong married Delicia Lai (born 1960).

== Research ==
In the 1970s and 1980s Ong did important research on charge-density waves. After the discovery of high temperature superconductivity, Ong worked on transport phenomena in cuprate semiconductors. In recent years, Ong has done research on Dirac and Weyl semimetals, the thermal Hall effect, and topological superconductors.

In 2000, Ong’s group found that the cuprate pair condensate survives to temperatures high above T_{C}. The loss of superconductivity at T_{C} arises from the collapse of phase rigidity rather than the closing of a gap. However, its existence is betrayed by a large Nernst effect and a large orbital diamagnetism. In topological matter, Ong with Bob Cava detected (2010) surface Dirac states in the topological insulator Bi_{2}Te_{3} by measuring quantum oscillations in a tilted magnetic field. In 2014, Ong and Cava obtained evidence for the predicted "chiral anomaly" in the Dirac semimetals Na_{3}Bi and GdPtBi. In several frustrated quantum magnets, Ong’s group has found that spin excitations produce a large thermal Hall current despite being strictly charge-neutral.

== Awards and honors ==
- 1982–1984 — Alfred P. Sloan Research Fellowship
- 1989 — elected a Fellow of the American Physical Society, "For research on transport properties of low-dimensional systems, especially the phenomena of sliding charge-density waves"
- 2006 — H. Kamerlingh Onnes Prize (shared with Hidenori Takagi and Shin-ichi Uchida) "for pioneering and seminal transport experiments which illuminated the unconventional nature of the metallic state of high temperature superconducting cuprates"
- 2006 — elected a Fellow of the American Academy of Arts and Sciences
- 2010 — Lecturer in Distinguished Lecture Series, Lewiner Institute for Theoretical Physics, Technion, Haifa (3 lectures on cuprates and topological insulators), April 28-May 4, 2010
- 2010 — elected a Fellow of the American Association for the Advancement of Science
- 2012 — elected a Member of the U.S. National Academy of Sciences
- 2014 — Experimental Investigators in Quantum Materials Award from Gordon and Betty Moore Foundation
- 2014–2018 — listed among Thomas Reuters Highly Cited Researchers

== Patents ==
- 1991 — with Zhao Z. Wang: U.S. Patent No. 4,996.186 "Flux Method for producing crystals of YBa_{2}Cu_{3}O_{7}"
- 2016 — with Ali Yazdani and Robert J. Cava: U.S. Patent No. 9331020: "Electronic interconnects and devices with topological surface states and methods for fabricating same."

== Selected publications ==
- with Ravin Bhatt: More is Different: Fifty Years of Condensed Matter Physics, Princeton University Press, 2001
