= Barium orthotitanate =

Barium orthotitanate is the inorganic compound with the chemical formula Ba_{2}TiO_{4}. It is a colourless solid that is of interest because of its relationship to barium titanate, a useful electroceramic.

== Structure ==
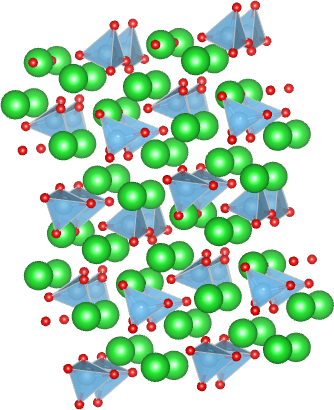
Low-temperature Ba_{2}TiO_{4} – TiO_{4} tetrahedra shaded blue; Ba atoms green; O atoms red

The solid has two known phases: a low-temperature (β) phase with P2_{1}/n symmetry and a high-temperature (α′) phase with P2_{1}nb symmetry. The structure of Ba_{2}TiO_{4} is unusual among the titanates because its titanium atoms sit in a four-oxygen tetrahedron rather than a six-oxygen octahedron.

== Production ==
It forms as white crystals from a melt of BaCl_{2}, BaCO_{3} and TiO_{2} or from just sintering BaCO_{3} and TiO_{2}. Another method of preparation is heating pellets of Ba(OH)_{2} and TiO_{2}. Additionally, there are polymer precursor, sol-gel and reverse micellar routes to Ba_{2}TiO_{4} synthesis. Ba_{2}TiO_{4} has also been successfully grown as a thin film with chemical vapor deposition.

== Properties ==
- Room temperature entropy – 47.0 cal/deg. mol
- Dielectric constant – 20 (at 100 kHz)
- It is hygroscopic and decomposes with swelling in moist air.

Barium orthotitanate can remove up to 99.9% of CO_{2} from a high-temperature gas stream by the reaction:

Ba_{2}TiO_{4} + CO_{2} → BaTiO_{3} + BaCO_{3}
