= Alan M. Portis =

American physicist

Alan Mark Portis
- Born: 17 July 1926
- Died: 6 September 2010
- Scientific career
- Institutions: UC Berkeley
- Notable students: Earl D. Shaw

Alan Mark Portis (July 17, 1926 – September 6, 2010) was an American solid-state physicist and founder of the Berkeley Physics Laboratory.

== Career ==
Alan Portis was the dean of engineering at Berkeley as well as an engineering professor. He was an early researcher in electron paramagnetic resonance. He also founded the Berkeley Physics Laboratory. For the development of laboratory courses and curricula at UC Berkeley, he received the Millikan Medal from the American Association of Physics Teachers. Portis was the doctoral advisor of the 2000 Nobel Prize laureate in Chemistry Alan J. Heeger, as well as Nai Phuan Ong and Myron Salamon, both of whom were elected Fellows of the American Physical Society.

Portis was a Guggenheim Fellow in 1965. Portis was elected a Fellow of the American Association for the Advancement of Science in February 1976. He was also a Fellow of the American Physical Society.

Portis was also the first director of Berkeley's Lawrence Hall of Science, and one of the founders of the Search for Excellence in Science and Mathematics (SESAME) Group at UC Berkeley.
