= YbBiPt =

Names
- Other names Ytterbium bismuth platinum

Identifiers
3D model (JSmol)	Interactive image
- InChI: InChI=1S/Bi.Pt.Yb
- SMILES: [Yb].[Bi].[Pt]

Properties
Chemical formula	YbBiPt

Structure
Crystal structure	Half Heusler structure (MgAgAs type)
Space group	F4̅3m (No. 216)
Lattice constant	a = 659.53 pm
- Except where otherwise noted, data are given for materials in their standard state (at 25 °C [77 °F], 100 kPa). Infobox references

YbBiPt (ytterbium-bismuth-platinum; also named YbPtBi) is an intermetallic material which at low temperatures exhibits an extremely high value of specific heat, which is a characteristic of heavy-fermion behavior. YbBiPt has a noncentrosymmetric cubic crystal structure; in particular it belongs to the ternary half-Heusler compounds.

== Discovery ==
YbBiPt was discovered by Zachary Fisk (Los Alamos National Laboratory) and coworkers in 1991 in the context of material research devoted to correlated electron systems such as heavy-fermion metals and Kondo insulators. Then the material was studied in detail due to its unconventional properties at very low temperatures (below 1 K).

== Material properties ==
YbBiPt crystallizes in the MgAgAs structure, which is also known as the half-Heusler structure. YbBiPt exhibits metallic behavior, e.g. continuously decreasing electrical resistivity upon cooling. The temperature dependence of the specific heat shows an anomaly at 0.4K and linear behavior at yet lower temperatures with the enormous Sommerfeld coefficient (which describes the linear-in-temperature contribution to the specific heat caused by metallic electrons) of 8J/(mol Yb K^{2}), which indicates an effective mass of the charge carriers that is extremely large even for heavy-fermion standards.

== Larger context ==
The crystal structure of YbBiPt makes it an example of the Heusler compounds, more precisely of the so-called half-Heuslers which have XYZ composition. In recent years, there has been a large interest in this material class due to the large variety of physical properties that can be found, and many new Heusler materials have been discovered.
