= Lanthanum aluminate-strontium titanate interface =

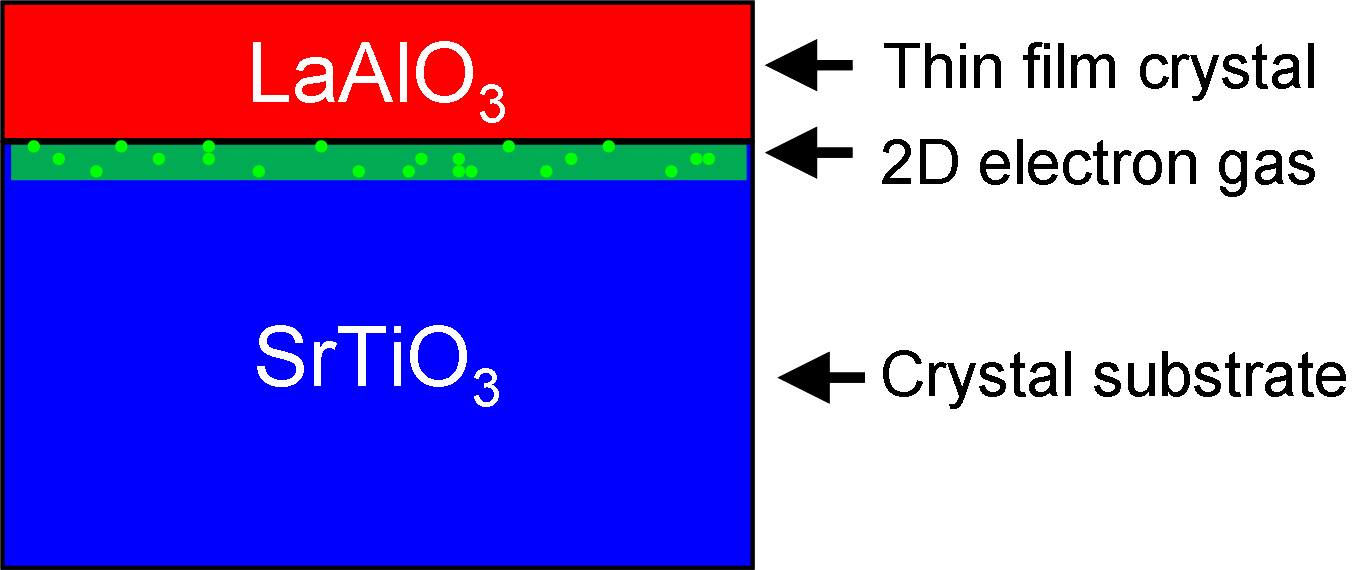

The interface between lanthanum aluminate (LaAlO_{3}) and strontium titanate (SrTiO_{3}) is a notable materials interface because it exhibits properties not found in its constituent materials. Individually, LaAlO_{3} and SrTiO_{3} are non-magnetic insulators, yet LaAlO_{3}/SrTiO_{3} interfaces can exhibit electrical metallic conductivity, superconductivity, ferromagnetism, large negative in-plane magnetoresistance, and giant persistent photoconductivity. The study of how these properties emerge at the LaAlO_{3}/SrTiO_{3} interface is a growing area of research in condensed matter physics.

== Emergent properties ==
=== Conductivity ===
Under the right conditions, the LaAlO_{3}/SrTiO_{3} interface is electrically conductive, like a metal. The angular dependence of Shubnikov–de Haas oscillations indicates that the conductivity is two-dimensional, leading many researchers to refer to it as a two-dimensional electron gas (2DEG). Two-dimensional does not mean that the conductivity has zero thickness, but rather that the electrons are confined to only move in two directions. It is also sometimes called a two-dimensional electron liquid (2DEL) to emphasize the importance of inter-electron interactions.

==== Conditions necessary for conductivity ====
Not all LaAlO_{3}/SrTiO_{3} interfaces are conductive. Typically, conductivity is achieved only when:

- The LaAlO_{3}/SrTiO_{3} interface is along the 001,110 and 111 crystallographic direction
- The LaAlO_{3} and SrTiO_{3} are crystalline and epitaxial
- The SrTiO_{3} side of the interface is TiO_{2}-terminated (causing the LaAlO_{3} side of the interface to be LaO-terminated)
- The LaAlO_{3} layer is at least 4 unit cells thick

Conductivity can also be achieved when the SrTiO_{3} is doped with oxygen vacancies; however, in that case, the interface is technically LaAlO_{3}/SrTiO_{3−x} instead of LaAlO_{3}/SrTiO_{3}.

==== Hypotheses for conductivity ====
The source of conductivity at the LaAlO_{3}/SrTiO_{3} interface has been debated for years. SrTiO_{3} is a wide-band gap semiconductor that can be doped n-type in a variety of ways. Clarifying the mechanism behind the conductivity is a major goal of current research. Four leading hypotheses are:

- Polar gating
- Oxygen vacancies
- Intermixing
- Structural distortions

===== Polar gating =====
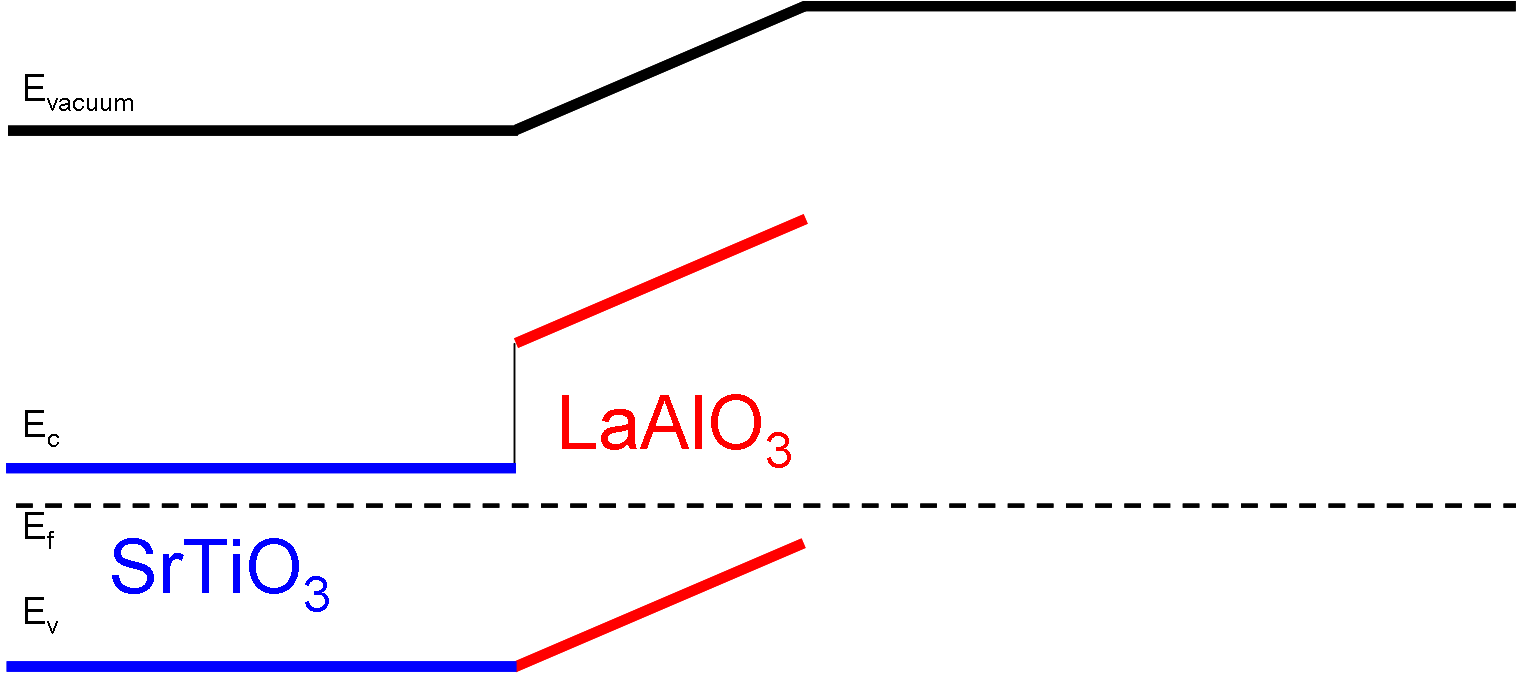
Below the critical thickness: Further from the interface, the energy of electrons in the LaAlO_{3} rises, due to the LaAlO_{3}'s built-in electric field. (Not to scale)

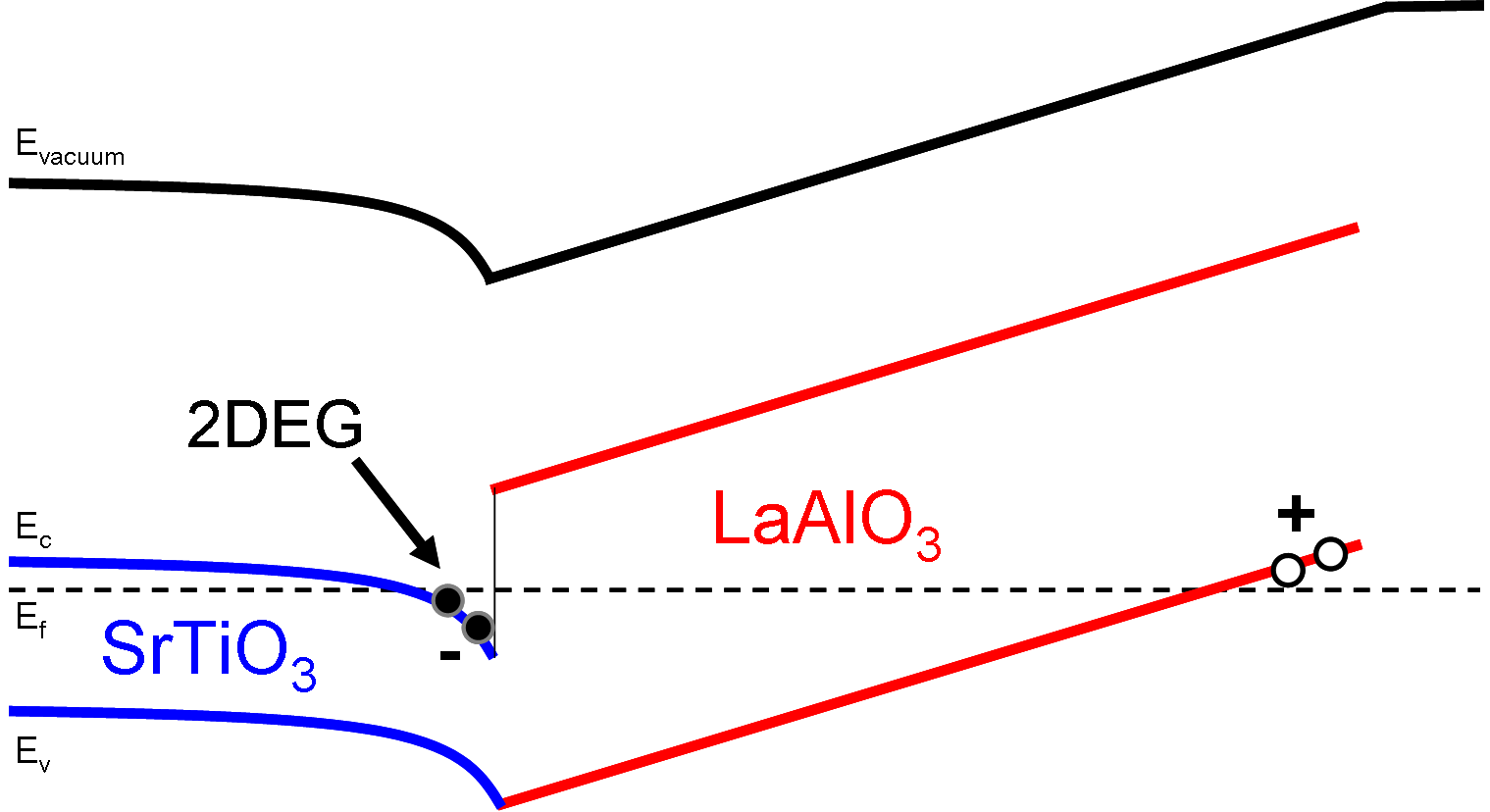
Above the critical thickness: As the LaAlO_{3} grows thicker, the energy of electrons on the surface rises so high that they leave, leaving holes (or oxygen vacancies) behind. The positively charged holes (or oxygen vacancies) attract electrons to the lowest-energy empty states, located in the conduction band of the SrTiO_{3}. (Not to scale)

Polar gating was the first mechanism used to explain the conductivity at LaAlO_{3}/SrTiO_{3} interfaces. It postulates that the LaAlO_{3}, which is polar in the 001 direction (with alternating sheets of positive and negative charge), acts as an electrostatic gate on the semiconducting SrTiO_{3}. When the LaAlO_{3} layer grows thicker than three unit cells, its valence band energy rises above the Fermi level, causing holes (or positively charged oxygen vacancies ) to form on the outer surface of the LaAlO_{3}. The positive charge on the surface of the LaAlO_{3} attracts negative charge to nearby available states. In the case of the LaAlO_{3}/SrTiO_{3} interface, this means electrons accumulate in the surface of the SrTiO_{3}, in the Ti d bands.

The strengths of the polar gating hypothesis are that it explains why conductivity requires a critical thickness of four unit cells of LaAlO_{3} and that it explains why conductivity requires the SrTiO_{3} to be TiO_{2}-terminated. The polar gating hypothesis also explains why alloying the LaAlO_{3} increases the critical thickness for conductivity.

One weakness of the hypothesis is that it predicts that the LaAlO_{3} films should exhibit a built-in electric field; so far, x-ray photoemission experiments and other experiments have shown little to no built-in field in the LaAlO_{3} films. The polar gating hypothesis also cannot explain why Ti^{3+} is detected when the LaAlO_{3} films are thinner than the critical thickness for conductivity.

The polar gating hypothesis is sometimes called the polar catastrophe hypothesis, alluding to the counterfactual scenario where electrons don't accumulate at the interface and instead voltage in the LaAlO_{3} builds up forever. The hypothesis has also been called the electronic reconstruction hypothesis, highlighting the fact that electrons, not ions, move to compensate the building voltage.

===== Oxygen vacancies =====
Another hypothesis is that the conductivity comes from free electrons left by oxygen vacancies in the SrTiO_{3}. SrTiO_{3} is known to be easily doped by oxygen vacancies, so this was initially considered a promising hypothesis. However, electron energy loss spectroscopy measurements have bounded the density of oxygen vacancies well below the density necessary to supply the measured free electron densities. Another proposed possibility is that oxygen vacancies in the surface of the LaAlO_{3} are remotely doping the SrTiO_{3}. Under generic growth conditions, multiple mechanisms can coexist. A systematic study across a wide growth parameter space demonstrated different roles played by oxygen vacancy formation and the polar gating at different interfaces. An obvious difference between oxygen vacancies and polar gating in creating the interface conductivity is that the carriers from oxygen vacancies are thermally activated as the donor level of oxygen vacancies is usually separated from the SrTiO_{3} conduction band, consequently exhibiting the carrier freeze-out effect at low temperatures; in contrast, the carriers originating from the polar gating are transferred into the SrTiO_{3} conduction band (Ti 3d orbitals) and are therefore degenerate.

===== Intermixing =====
Lanthanum is a known dopant in SrTiO_{3}, so it has been suggested that La from the LaAlO_{3} mixes into the SrTiO_{3} and dopes it n-type. Multiple studies have shown that intermixing takes place at the interface; however, it is not clear whether there is enough intermixing to provide all of the free carriers. For example, a flipped interface between a SrTiO_{3} film and a LaAlO_{3} substrate is insulating.

===== Structural distortions =====
A fourth hypothesis is that the LaAlO_{3} crystal structure undergoes octahedral rotations in response to the strain from the SrTiO_{3}. These octahedral rotations in the LaAlO_{3} induce octahedral rotations in the SrTiO_{3}, increasing the Ti d-band width enough so that electrons are no longer localized.

=== Superconductivity ===
Superconductivity was first observed in LaAlO_{3}/SrTiO_{3} interfaces in 2007, with a critical temperature of ~200 mK. Like the conductivity, the superconductivity appears to be two-dimensional.

=== Ferromagnetism ===
Hints of ferromagnetism in LaAlO_{3}/SrTiO_{3} were first seen in 2007, when Dutch researchers observed hysteresis in the magnetoresistance of LaAlO_{3}/SrTiO_{3}. Follow up measurements with torque magnetometry indicated that the magnetism in LaAlO_{3}/SrTiO_{3} persisted all the way to room temperature. In 2011, researchers at Stanford University used a scanning SQUID to directly image the ferromagnetism, and found that it occurred in heterogeneous patches. Like the conductivity in LaAlO_{3}/SrTiO_{3}, the magnetism only appeared when the LaAlO_{3} films were thicker than a few unit cells. However, unlike conductivity, magnetism was seen at SrO-terminated surfaces as well as TiO_{2}-terminated surfaces.

The discovery of ferromagnetism in a materials system that also superconducts spurred a flurry of research and debate, because ferromagnetism and superconductivity almost never coexist together. Ferromagnetism requires electron spins to align, while superconductivity typically requires electron spins to anti-align.

=== Magnetoresistance ===
Magnetoresistance measurements are a major experimental tool used to understand the electronic properties of materials. The magnetoresistance of LaAlO_{3}/SrTiO_{3} interfaces has been used to reveal the 2D nature of conduction, carrier concentrations (through the hall effect), electron mobilities, and more.

==== Field applied out-of-plane ====
At low magnetic field, the magnetoresistance of LaAlO_{3}/SrTiO_{3} is parabolic versus field, as expected for an ordinary metal. However, at higher fields, the magnetoresistance appears to become linear versus field. Linear magnetoresistance can have many causes, but so far there is no scientific consensus on the cause of linear magnetoresistance in LaAlO_{3}/SrTiO_{3} interfaces. Linear magnetoresistance has also been measured in pure SrTiO_{3} crystals, so it may be unrelated to the emergent properties of the interface.

==== Field applied in-plane ====
At low temperature (T < 30 K), the LaAlO_{3}/SrTiO_{3} interface exhibits negative in-plane magnetoresistance, sometimes as large as -90%. The large negative in-plane magnetoresistance has been ascribed to the interface's enhanced spin-orbit interaction.

=== Electron gas distribution at the LaAlO_{3}/SrTiO_{3} interface ===
Experimentally, the charge density profile of the electron gas at the LaAlO_{3}/SrTiO_{3} interface has a strongly asymmetric shape with a rapid initial decay over the first 2 nm and a pronounced tail that extends to about 11 nm. A wide variety of theoretical calculations support this result. Importantly, to get electron distribution one have to take into account field-dependent dielectric constant of SrTiO_{3}.

== Comparison to other 2D electron gases ==
The 2D electron gas that arises at the LaAlO_{3}/SrTiO_{3} interface is notable for two main reasons. First, it has very high carrier concentration, on the order of 10^{13} cm^{−2}. Second, if the polar gating hypothesis is true, the 2D electron gas has the potential to be totally free of disorder, unlike other 2D electron gases that require doping or gating to form. However, so far researchers have been unable to synthesize interfaces that realize the promise of low disorder.

== Synthesis methods ==
Interfaces are synthesized by shooting a laser at a LaAlO_{3} target. Ablated material flies off the target and lands onto a heated SrTiO_{3} crystal.

Most LaAlO_{3}/SrTiO_{3} interfaces are synthesized using pulsed laser deposition. A high-power laser ablates a LaAlO_{3} target, and the plume of ejected material is deposited onto a heated SrTiO_{3} substrate. Typical conditions used are:

- Laser wavelength of 248 nm
- Laser fluence of 0.5 J/cm^{2} to 2 J/cm^{2}
- Substrate temperature of 600 °C to 850 °C
- Background oxygen pressure of 10^{−5} Torr to 10^{−3} Torr

Some LaAlO_{3}/SrTiO_{3} interfaces have also been synthesized by molecular beam epitaxy, sputtering, and atomic layer deposition.

== Similar interfaces ==
To better understand in the LaAlO_{3}/SrTiO_{3} interface, researchers have synthesized a number of analogous interfaces between other polar perovskite films and SrTiO_{3}. Some of these analogues have properties similar to LaAlO_{3}/SrTiO_{3}, but some do not.

=== Conductive interfaces ===
- GdTiO_{3}/SrTiO_{3}
- LaTiO_{3}/SrTiO_{3}
- LaVO_{3}/SrTiO_{3}
- LaGaO_{3}/SrTiO_{3}
- PrAlO_{3}/SrTiO_{3}
- NdAlO_{3}/SrTiO_{3}
- NdGaO_{3}/SrTiO_{3}
- GdAlO_{3}/SrTiO_{3}
- Nd_{0.35}Sr_{0.65}MnO_{3}/SrTiO_{3}
- Al_{2}O_{3}/SrTiO_{3}
- amorphous-YAlO_{3}/SrTiO_{3}
- La_{0.5}Al_{0.5}Sr_{0.5}Ti_{0.5}O_{3}/SrTiO_{3}
- DyScO_{3}/SrTiO_{3}
- KTaO_{3}/SrTiO_{3}
- CaZrO_{3}/SrTiO_{3}

=== Insulating interfaces ===
- LaCrO_{3}/SrTiO_{3}
- LaMnO_{3}/SrTiO_{3}
- La_{2}O_{3}/SrTiO_{3}
- Y_{2}O_{3}/SrTiO_{3}
- LaYO_{3}/SrTiO_{3}
- EuAlO_{3}/SrTiO_{3}
- BiMnO_{3}/SrTiO_{3}

== Applications ==
As of 2015, there are no commercial applications of the LaAlO_{3}/SrTiO_{3} interface. However, speculative applications have been suggested, including field-effect devices, sensors, photodetectors, and thermoelectrics; related LaVO_{3}/SrTiO_{3} is a functional solar cell albeit hitherto with a low efficiency.
