= Half-metal =

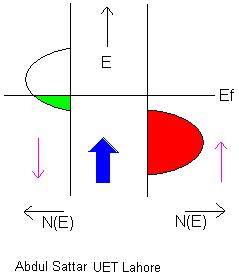
The electronic structure of a half-metal. $E_f$ is the Fermi level, $N(E)$ is the density of states for spin down (on the left) and spin up (on the right). In this case, the half-metal is conducting in the minority spin channel.

A half-metal is any substance that acts as a conductor to electrons of one spin orientation, but as an insulator or semiconductor to those of the opposite orientation. Although all half-metals are ferromagnetic (or ferrimagnetic), most ferromagnets are not half-metals. Many of the known examples of half-metals are oxides, sulfides, or Heusler alloys. Types of half-metallic compounds theoretically predicted so far include some Heusler alloys, such as Co_{2}FeSi, NiMnSb, and PtMnSb; some Si-containing half–Heusler alloys with Curie temperatures over 600 K, such as NiCrSi and PdCrSi; some transition-metal oxides, including rutile structured CrO_{2}; some perovskites, such as LaMnO_{3} and SeMnO_{3}; and a few more simply structured zincblende (ZB) compounds, including CrAs and superlattices. NiMnSb and CrO_{2} have been experimentally determined to be half-metals at very low temperatures.

In half-metals, the valence band for one spin orientation is partially filled while there is a gap in the density of states for the other spin orientation. This results in conducting behavior for only electrons in the first spin orientation. In some half-metals, the majority spin channel is the conducting one while in others the minority channel is.

Half-metals were first described in 1983, as an explanation for the electrical properties of manganese-based Heusler alloys.

Some notable half-metals are chromium(IV) oxide, magnetite, and lanthanum strontium manganite (LSMO), as well as chromium arsenide. Half-metals have attracted some interest for their potential use in spintronics.

In July 2025, researchers reported the first experimental realization of a two-dimensional (2D) half-metal: a bilayer FePd alloy grown on a Pd(001) substrate. This system, composed of only two atomic layers, exhibits complete spin polarization at the Fermi level, as demonstrated by momentum and spin-resolved photoelectron spectroscopy. The half-metallicity is confined to the two-atomic-layer limit and modulated by the Fe-Pd content within the bilayer. The FePd bilayer remains half-metallic at room temperature, is structurally robust, and exhibits tunable electronic properties through variation in Fe content. These features make it a promising platform for nanoscale spintronic applications such as spin filters and spin–orbit torque devices.
