= Solid-state reaction route =

Preparation method for polycrystalline solids

The solid-state reaction route is the most widely used method for the preparation of polycrystalline solids from a mixture of solid starting materials. Solids do not react together at room temperature over normal time scales and it is necessary to heat them to much higher temperatures, often to 1000 to 1500 °C, in order for the reaction to occur at an appreciable rate. The factors on which the feasibility and rate of a solid state reaction depend include, reaction conditions, structural properties of the reactants, surface area of the solids, their reactivity and the thermodynamic free energy change associated with the reaction.

== Outline of the experimental procedure ==
=== Reagents ===
These are the solid reactants from which it is proposed to prepare a solid crystalline compound. The selection of reactant chemicals depends on the reaction conditions and expected nature of the product. The reactants are dried thoroughly prior to weighing. As increase in surface area enhances the reaction rate, fine grained materials should be used if possible.

=== Mixing ===
After the reactants have been weighed out in the required amounts, they are mixed. For manual mixing of small quantities, usually an agate mortar and pestle are employed. Sufficient amount of some volatile organic liquid – preferably acetone or alcohol – is added to the mixture to aid homogenization. This forms a paste which is mixed thoroughly. During the process of grinding and mixing, the organic liquid gradually volatilizes and has usually evaporated completely after 10 to 15 minutes. For quantities much larger than ~20g, mechanical mixing is usually adopted using a ball mill.

=== Container material ===
For the subsequent reaction at high temperatures, it is necessary to choose a suitable container material which is chemically inert to the reactants under the heating conditions used. The noble metals, platinum and gold, are usually suitable. Containers may be crucibles or boats made from foil. For low temperature reactions, other metals like Nickel (below 600–700 °C) can be used.

=== Heat treatment ===
The heating programme to be used depends very much on the form and reactivity of the reactants. In the control of either temperature or atmosphere, nature of the reactant chemicals are considered in detail. A good furnace is used for heat treatment. Pelleting of samples is preferred prior to heating, since it increases the area of contact between the grains.

== Analysis ==
The product materials are analyzed using various characterization techniques such as X-ray diffraction (XRD), scanning electron microscopy (SEM), transmission electron microscopy (TEM), etc.
