= Strontium titanate =

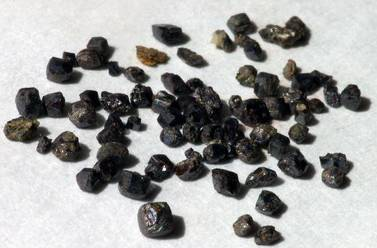
- Sample of strontium titanite as tausonite

Names
- Other names Strontium titanium oxide Tausonite STO

Identifiers
CAS Number	12060-59-2
3D model (JSmol)	Interactive image; Interactive image
ChemSpider	74801
ECHA InfoCard	100.031.846
EC Number	235-044-1
MeSH	Strontium+titanium+oxide
PubChem CID	82899
UNII	OLH4I98373
CompTox Dashboard (EPA)	DTXSID70893688
- InChI: InChI=1S/3O.Sr.Ti/q;2*-1;+2; Key: VEALVRVVWBQVSL-UHFFFAOYSA-N; InChI=1/3O.Sr.Ti/q;2*-1;+2;/rO3Ti.Sr/c1-4(2)3;/q-2;+2 Key: VEALVRVVWBQVSL-VUHNDFTMAE
- SMILES: [Sr++].[O-][Ti]([O-])=O; [Sr+2].[O-][Ti]([O-])=O

Properties
Chemical formula	SrTiO_{3}
Molar mass	183.49 g/mol
Appearance	White, opaque crystals
Density	5.11 g/cm^{3}
Melting point	2,080 °C (3,780 °F; 2,350 K)
Solubility in water	insoluble
Band gap	indirect: 3.25 eV; direct: 3.75 eV
Refractive index (n_{D})	2.394

Structure
Crystal structure	Cubic Perovskite
Space group	Pm3̅m, No. 221
- Except where otherwise noted, data are given for materials in their standard state (at 25 °C [77 °F], 100 kPa). verify (what is ?) Infobox references

Strontium titanate is an oxide of strontium and titanium with the chemical formula SrTiO_{3}. At room temperature, it is a centrosymmetric paraelectric material with a perovskite structure. At low temperatures it approaches a ferroelectric phase transition with a very large dielectric constant ~10^{4} but remains paraelectric down to the lowest temperatures measured as a result of quantum fluctuations, making it a quantum paraelectric. It was long thought to be a wholly artificial material, until 1982 when its natural counterpart—discovered in Siberia and named tausonite—was recognised by the IMA. Tausonite remains an extremely rare mineral in nature, occurring as very tiny crystals. Its most important application has been in its synthesized form wherein it is occasionally encountered as a diamond simulant, in precision optics, in varistors, and in advanced ceramics.

The name tausonite was given in honour of Lev Vladimirovich Tauson (1917–1989), a Russian geochemist. Disused trade names for the synthetic product include strontium mesotitanate, Diagem, and Marvelite. This product is currently being marketed for its use in jewelry under the name Fabulite. Other than its type locality of the Murun Massif in the Sakha Republic, natural tausonite is also found in Cerro Sarambi, Concepción department, Paraguay; and along the Kotaki River of Honshū, Japan.

== Properties ==
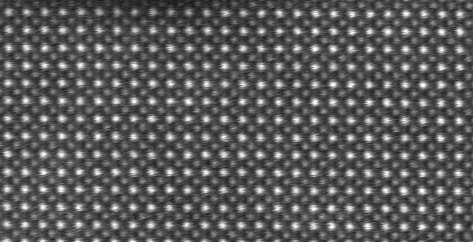
Atomic resolution image of SrTiO_{3} acquired using a Scanning Transmission Electron Microscope (STEM) and a high angle annular dark field (HAADF) detector. Brighter spots are columns of atoms containing Sr, and darker spots contain Ti. Columns containing only O atoms are not visible.

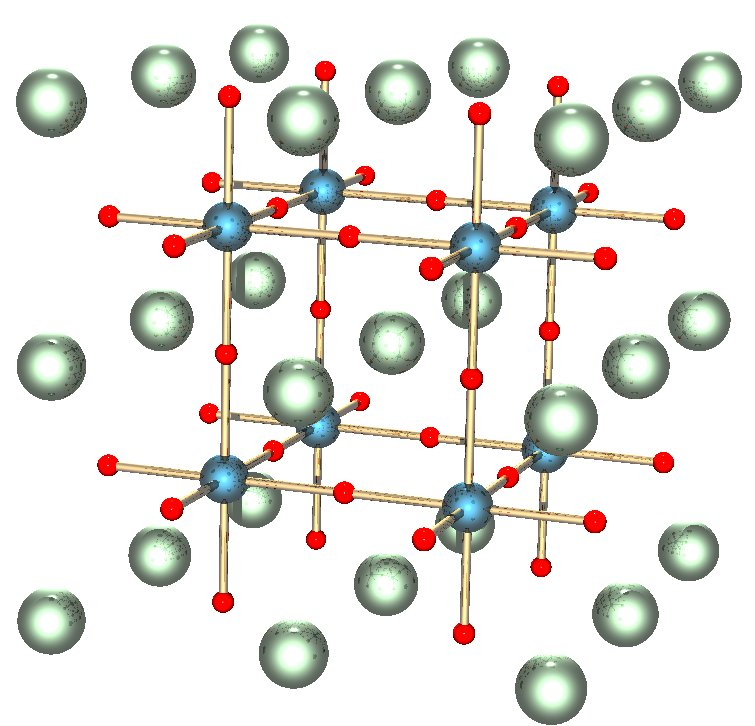
Structure of SrTiO_{3}. The red spheres are oxygens, blue are Ti^{4+} cations, and the green ones are Sr^{2+}.

SrTiO_{3} has an indirect band gap of 3.25 eV and a direct gap of 3.75 eV in the typical range of semiconductors. Synthetic strontium titanate has a very large dielectric constant (300) at room temperature and low electric field. It has a specific resistivity of over 10^{9} Ω-cm for very pure crystals. It is also used in high-voltage capacitors. Introducing mobile charge carriers by doping leads to Fermi-liquid metallic behavior already at very low charge carrier densities. At high electron densities strontium titanate becomes superconducting below 0.35 K and was the first insulator and oxide discovered to be superconductive.

12-coordinated cuboctahedral coordination environment of strontium (Sr) surrounded by oxygen (O) atoms in the cubic perovskite structure of SrTiO_{3}.

6-coordinated octahedral coordination environment of titanium (Ti) surrounded by oxygen (O) atoms in the cubic perovskite structure of SrTiO_{3}.

Strontium titanate is both much denser (specific gravity 4.88 for natural, 5.13 for synthetic) and much softer (Mohs hardness 5.5 for synthetic, 6–6.5 for natural) than diamond. Its crystal system is cubic and its refractive index (2.410—as measured by sodium light, 589.3 nm) is nearly identical to that of diamond (at 2.417), but the dispersion (the optical property responsible for the "fire" of the cut gemstones) of strontium titanate is 4.3× that of diamond, at 0.190 (B–G interval). This results in a shocking display of fire compared to diamond and diamond simulants such as YAG, GAG, GGG, Cubic Zirconia, and Moissanite.

Synthetics are usually transparent and colourless, but can be doped with certain rare earth or transition metals to give reds, yellows, browns, and blues. Natural tausonite is usually translucent to opaque, in shades of reddish brown, dark red, or grey. Both have an adamantine (diamond-like) lustre. Strontium titanate is considered extremely brittle with a conchoidal fracture; natural material is cubic or octahedral in habit and streaks brown. Through a hand-held (direct vision) spectroscope, doped synthetics will exhibit a rich absorption spectrum typical of doped stones. Synthetic material has a melting point of ca. 2080 °C (3776 °F) and is readily attacked by hydrofluoric acid. Under extremely low oxygen partial pressure, strontium titanate decomposes via incongruent sublimation of strontium well below the melting temperature.

At temperatures lower than 105 K, its cubic structure transforms to tetragonal. Its monocrystals can be used as optical windows and high-quality sputter deposition targets.

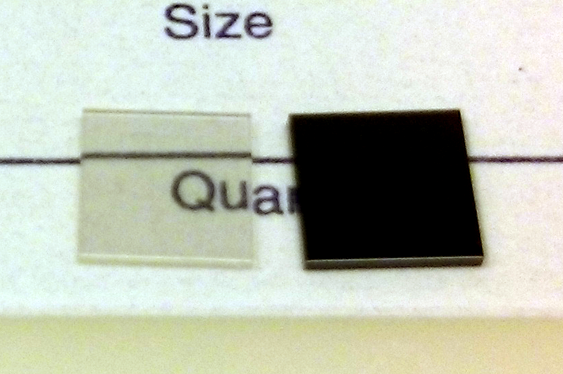
Strontium titanate single crystal substrates (5×5×0.5mm). The transparent substrate (left) is pure SrTiO_{3} and the black substrate is doped with 0.5% (weight) of niobium

SrTiO_{3} is an excellent substrate for epitaxial growth of high-temperature superconductors and many oxide-based thin films. It is particularly well known as the substrate for the growth of the lanthanum aluminate-strontium titanate interface. Doping strontium titanate with niobium makes it electrically conductive, being one of the only conductive commercially available single crystal substrates for the growth of perovskite oxides. Its bulk lattice parameter of 3.905Å makes it suitable as the substrate for the growth of many other oxides, including the rare-earth manganites, titanates, lanthanum aluminate (LaAlO_{3}), strontium ruthenate (SrRuO_{3}) and many others. Oxygen vacancies are fairly common in SrTiO_{3} crystals and thin films. Oxygen vacancies induce free electrons in the conduction band of the material, making it more conductive and opaque. These vacancies can be caused by exposure to reducing conditions, such as high vacuum at elevated temperatures.

High-quality, epitaxial SrTiO_{3} layers can also be grown on silicon without forming silicon dioxide, thereby making SrTiO_{3} an alternative gate dielectric material. This also enables the integration of other thin film perovskite oxides onto silicon.

SrTiO_{3} can change its properties when it is exposed to light. These changes depend on the temperature and the defects in the material. SrTiO_{3} has been shown to possess persistent photoconductivity where exposing the crystal to light will increase its electrical conductivity by over 2 orders of magnitude. After the light is turned off, the enhanced conductivity persists for several days, with negligible decay. At low temperatures, the main effects of light are electronic, meaning that they involve the creation, movement, and recombination of electrons and holes (positive charges) in the material. These effects include photoconductivity, photoluminescence, photovoltage, and photochromism. They are influenced by the defect chemistry of SrTiO_{3}, which determines the energy levels, band gap, carrier concentration, and mobility of the material. At high temperatures (>200 °C), the main effects of light are photoionic, meaning that they involve the migration of oxygen vacancies (negative ions) in the material. These vacancies are the main ionic defects in SrTiO_{3}, and they can alter the electronic structure, defect chemistry, and surface properties of the material. These effects include photoinduced phase transitions, photoinduced oxygen exchange, and photoinduced surface reconstruction. They are influenced by the oxygen pressure, the crystal structure, and the doping level of SrTiO_{3}.

Due to the significant ionic and electronic conduction of SrTiO_{3}, it is potent to be used as the mixed conductor.

== Synthesis ==
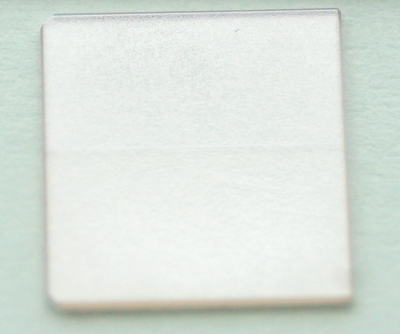
A plate cut out of synthetic SrTiO_{3} crystal

Synthetic strontium titanate was one of several titanates patented during the late 1940s and early 1950s; other titanates included barium titanate and calcium titanate. Research was conducted primarily at the National Lead Company (later renamed NL Industries) in the United States, by Leon Merker and Langtry E. Lynd. Merker and Lynd first patented the growth process on February 10, 1953; a number of refinements were subsequently patented over the next four years, such as modifications to the feed powder and additions of colouring dopants.

A modification to the basic Verneuil process (also known as flame-fusion) is the favoured method of growth. An inverted oxy-hydrogen blowpipe is used, with feed powder mixed with oxygen carefully fed through the blowpipe in the typical fashion, but with the addition of a third pipe to deliver oxygen—creating a tricone burner. The extra oxygen is required for successful formation of strontium titanate, which would otherwise fail to oxidize completely due to the titanium component. The ratio is ca. 1.5 volumes of hydrogen for each volume of oxygen. The highly purified feed powder is derived by first producing titanyl double oxalate salt (SrTiO(C_{2}O_{4})_{2} · 2 H_{2}O) by reacting strontium chloride (SrCl_{2}) and oxalic acid ((COOH)_{2} · 2 H_{2}O) with titanium tetrachloride (TiCl_{4}). The salt is washed to eliminate chloride, heated to 1000 °C in order to produce a free-flowing granular powder of the required composition, and is then ground and sieved to ensure all particles are between 0.2 and 0.5 micrometres in size.

The feed powder falls through the oxyhydrogen flame, melts, and lands on a rotating and slowly descending pedestal below. The height of the pedestal is constantly adjusted to keep its top at the optimal position below the flame, and over a number of hours the molten powder cools and crystallises to form a single pedunculated pear or boule crystal. This boule is usually no larger than 2.5 centimetres in diameter and 10 centimetres long; it is an opaque black to begin with, requiring further annealing in an oxidizing atmosphere in order to make the crystal colourless and to relieve strain. This is done at over 1000 °C for 12 hours.

Thin films of SrTiO_{3} can be grown epitaxially by various methods, including pulsed laser deposition, molecular beam epitaxy, RF sputtering and atomic layer deposition. As in most thin films, different growth methods can result in significantly different defect and impurity densities and crystalline quality, resulting in a large variation of the electronic and optical properties.

== Use as a diamond simulant ==
Its cubic structure and high dispersion once made synthetic strontium titanate a prime candidate for simulating diamond. Beginning c. 1955, large quantities of strontium titanate were manufactured for this sole purpose. Strontium titanate was in competition with synthetic rutile ("titania") at the time, and had the advantage of lacking the unfortunate yellow tinge and strong birefringence inherent to the latter material. While it was softer, it was significantly closer to diamond in likeness. Eventually, however, both would fall into disuse, being eclipsed by the creation of "better" simulants: first by yttrium aluminium garnet (YAG) and followed shortly after by gadolinium gallium garnet (GGG); and finally by the (to date) ultimate simulant in terms of diamond-likeness and cost-effectiveness, cubic zirconia.

Despite being outmoded, strontium titanate is still manufactured and periodically encountered in jewellery. It is one of the most costly of diamond simulants, and due to its rarity collectors may pay a premium for large i.e. >2 carat (400 mg) specimens. As a diamond simulant, strontium titanate is most deceptive when mingled with melée i.e. <0.20 carat (40 mg) stones and when it is used as the base material for a composite or doublet stone (with, e.g., synthetic corundum as the crown or top of the stone). Under the microscope, gemmologists distinguish strontium titanate from diamond by the former's softness—manifested by surface abrasions—and excess dispersion (to the trained eye), and occasional gas bubbles which are remnants of synthesis. Doublets can be detected by a join line at the girdle ("waist" of the stone) and flattened air bubbles or glue visible within the stone at the point of bonding.

== Use in radioisotope thermoelectric generators ==
Due to its high melting point and insolubility in water, strontium titanate has been used as a strontium-90-containing material in radioisotope thermoelectric generators (RTGs), such as the US Sentinel and Soviet Beta-M series. As strontium-90 has a high fission product yield and is easily extracted from spent nuclear fuel, Sr-90-based RTGs can in principle be produced cheaper than those based on plutonium-238 or other radionuclides which have to be produced in dedicated facilities. However, due to the lower power density (~0.45W_{thermal} per gram of strontium-90-titanate) and half-life, space-based applications, which put a particular premium on low weight, high reliability and longevity, prefer plutonium-238. Terrestrial off-grid applications of RTGs meanwhile have been largely phased out due to concern over orphan sources and the decreasing price and increasing availability of solar panels, small wind turbines, chemical battery storage and other off-grid power solutions.

== Use in solid oxide fuel cells ==
Strontium titanate's mixed conductivity has attracted attention for use in solid oxide fuel cells (SOFCs). It demonstrates both electronic and ionic conductivity which is useful for SOFC electrodes because there is an exchange of gas and oxygen ions in the material and electrons on both sides of the cell.

H_{2} + O^{2−} → H_{2}O + 2 e^{−} (anode)
½ O_{2} + 2 e^{−} → O^{2−} (cathode)

Strontium titanate is doped with different materials for use on different sides of a fuel cell. On the fuel side (anode), where the first reaction occurs, it is often doped with lanthanum to form lanthanum-doped strontium titanate (LST). In this case, the A-site, or position in the unit cell where strontium usually sits, is sometimes filled by lanthanum instead, this causes the material to exhibit n-type semiconductor properties, including electronic conductivity. It also shows oxygen ion conduction due to the perovskite structure tolerance for oxygen vacancies. This material has a thermal coefficient of expansion similar to that of the common electrolyte yttria-stabilized zirconia (YSZ), chemical stability during the reactions which occur at fuel cell electrodes, and electronic conductivity of up to 360 S/cm under SOFC operating conditions. Another key advantage of these LST is that it shows a resistance to sulfur poisoning, which is an issue with the currently used nickel - ceramic (cermet) anodes.

Another related compound is strontium titanium ferrite (STF) which is used as a cathode (oxygen-side) material in SOFCs. This material also shows mixed ionic and electronic conductivity which is important as it means the reduction reaction which happens at the cathode can occur over a wider area. Building on this material by adding cobalt on the B-site (replacing titanium) as well as iron, we have the material STFC, or cobalt-substituted STF, which shows remarkable stability as a cathode material as well as lower polarization resistance than other common cathode materials such as lanthanum strontium cobalt ferrite. These cathodes also have the advantage of not containing rare earth metals which make them cheaper than many of the alternatives.

== See also ==
- Calcium copper titanate
