= Lanthanum aluminate =

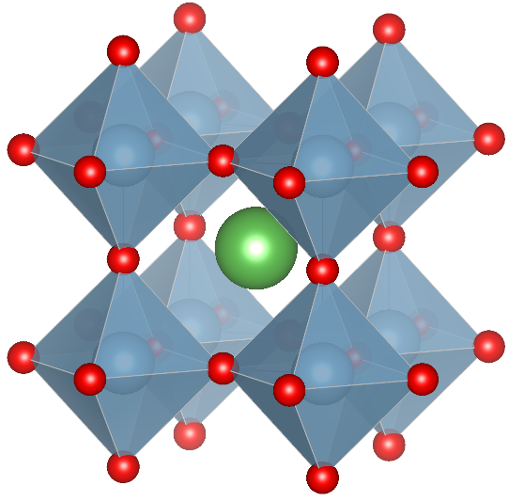

Identifiers
CAS Number	12003-65-5
3D model (JSmol)	Interactive image
ChemSpider	17345186
ECHA InfoCard	100.031.290
EC Number	234-433-3
PubChem CID	16217677
- InChI: InChI=1S/Al.La.3O Key: KJXBRHIPHIVJCS-UHFFFAOYSA-N
- SMILES: O=[Al]O[La]=O

Properties
Chemical formula	LaAlO_{3}
Molar mass	213.89 g/mol
Appearance	optically transparent, tan to brown
Odor	odorless
Density	6.52 g/cm^{3}
Melting point	2,080 °C (3,780 °F; 2,350 K)
Solubility in water	Insoluble in mineral acids at 25 °C. Soluble in H_{3}PO_{3} > 150 °C
- Except where otherwise noted, data are given for materials in their standard state (at 25 °C [77 °F], 100 kPa). Infobox references

Lanthanum aluminate is an inorganic compound with the formula LaAlO_{3}, often abbreviated as LAO. It is an optically transparent ceramic oxide with a distorted perovskite structure.

== History ==
Lanthanum aluminate was first synthesized and investigated during the mid-20th century as part of broader research into rare-earth oxide ceramics and compounds with the perovskite structure. Early work focused on determining its crystal structure, phase stability, dielectric properties, and methods for producing dense polycrystalline ceramics and single crystals. By the 1960s and 1970s, improvements in crystal growth techniques, including the Czochralski method, enabled the production of high-quality single-crystal LaAlO3 substrates for crystallographic studies and electronic applications.

Interest in lanthanum aluminate increased substantially during the late 1980s following the discovery of high-temperature superconductivity. Because its lattice parameter closely matches those of many perovskite oxides, single-crystal LaAlO3 became widely used as a substrate for the epitaxial growth of cuprate superconducting thin films and other complex oxide materials.

A major milestone occurred in 2004, when Akira Ohtomo and Harold Y. Hwang reported that the interface between epitaxial LaAlO3 and strontium titanate (SrTiO3) becomes electrically conductive once the LaAlO3 layer exceeds a critical thickness of four unit cells. This discovery revealed that an interface between two insulating oxides could host a high-mobility two-dimensional electron gas, stimulating extensive research into emergent interfacial phenomena including superconductivity, magnetism, and strong spin–orbit coupling. Since then, LaAlO3 has become one of the most widely studied materials in the field of complex oxide heterostructures.

== Properties ==
Crystalline LaAlO_{3} has a relatively high relative dielectric constant of ~25. LAO's crystal structure is a rhombohedral distorted perovskite with a pseudocubic lattice parameter of 3.787 angstroms at room temperature (although one source claims the lattice parameter is 3.82). Polished single crystal LAO surfaces show twin defects visible to the naked eye.

== Uses ==
=== Single-crystal substrates ===
Single crystals of lanthanum aluminate are widely used as substrates for the epitaxial growth of complex oxide thin films because of their good lattice matching with many perovskite materials. Commercial LaAlO3 substrates are commonly used for growing cuprate superconductors, ferroelectric oxides, multiferroics, and correlated-electron materials by techniques such as pulsed laser deposition, molecular beam epitaxy, and metalorganic chemical vapor deposition. Although other substrates, including strontium titanate, LSAT, and DyScO3, are increasingly employed depending on the application, LaAlO3 remains one of the standard substrate materials in oxide electronics.

=== Oxide heterostructures ===
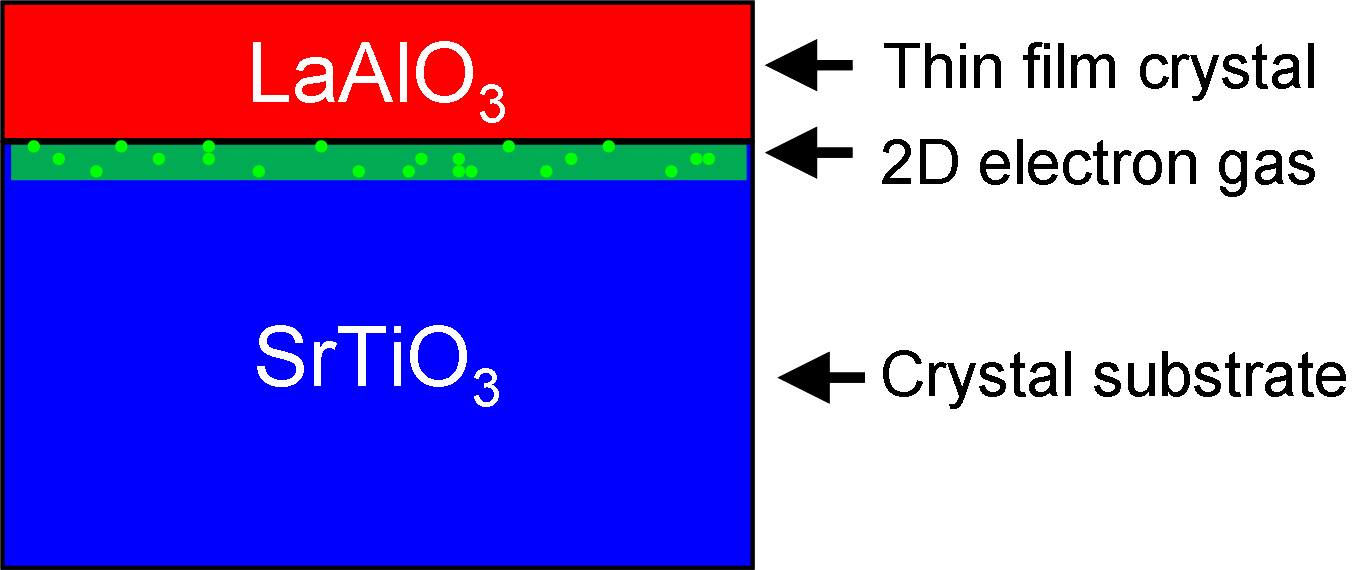
A schematic cross-section of the 2DEG formed at LaAlO3/SrTiO3 interfaces

The most extensively studied application of epitaxial LaAlO3 is in oxide heterostructures, particularly at the interface with strontium titanate (SrTiO3). In 2004, it was discovered that when four or more unit cells of LaAlO3 are grown epitaxially on TiO2-terminated SrTiO3, a conducting two-dimensional electron gas (2DEG) forms at the interface despite both materials being insulating in the bulk.

LaAlO3/SrTiO3 heterostructures have become a model system for investigating emergent phenomena in condensed matter physics, including superconductivity, magnetism, spin–orbit coupling, quantum transport, nanoscale electronic confinement, and electrically reconfigurable nanodevices. These interfaces are also explored as candidate platforms for oxide-based electronics and quantum devices.

=== Dielectric materials ===
Lanthanum aluminate has a relatively high relative dielectric constant (approximately 25) and low microwave dielectric loss, making it useful in microwave-frequency dielectric components and resonators. It has also been investigated as a candidate high-κ dielectric for silicon microelectronics, although it has not been adopted because of its limited thermodynamic stability in contact with silicon during high-temperature processing.

=== Optical and photonic applications ===
Because high-quality single crystals are transparent over a broad wavelength range, LaAlO3 has been investigated for optical components and as a host material for luminescent ions. Rare-earth-doped LaAlO3 crystals have been studied for solid-state lasers, phosphors, and other photonic applications, although these uses remain less widespread than its role as a substrate for epitaxial oxide films.

== See also ==
- Lanthanum aluminate-strontium titanate interface
- High-κ dielectrics
- LSAT (oxide)
- Perovskite structure
