= Sodium bismuth titanate =

Sodium bismuth titanate or bismuth sodium titanium oxide (NBT or BNT) is a solid inorganic compound of sodium, bismuth, titanium and oxygen with the chemical formula of Na_{0.5}Bi_{0.5}TiO_{3} or Bi_{0.5}Na_{0.5}TiO_{3}. This compound adopts the perovskite structure.

== Synthesis ==
Na_{0.5}Bi_{0.5}TiO_{3} is not a naturally occurring mineral and several synthesis routes to obtain the compound have been developed. It can be easily prepared by solid state reaction between Na_{2}CO_{3}, Bi_{2}O_{3} and TiO_{2} at temperatures around 850 °C.

== Structure ==
The exact room-temperature crystal structure of sodium bismuth titanate has been a matter of debate for several years. Early studies in the 1960s using X-ray diffraction suggested Na_{0.5}Bi_{0.5}TiO_{3} to adopt either a pseudo-cubic or a rhombohedral crystal structure. In 2010, based on the high-resolution single-crystal X-ray diffraction data, a monoclinic structure (space group Cc) was proposed. On heating, Na_{0.5}Bi_{0.5}TiO_{3} transforms at 533 ± 5 K to a tetragonal structure (space group P4bm) and above 793 ± 5 K to cubic structure (space group Pm3̅m).

== Physical properties ==
Na_{0.5}Bi_{0.5}TiO_{3} is a relaxor ferroelectric. Its optical band gap was reported to be in the 3.0–3.5 eV.

== Applications ==
Various solid solutions with tetragonal ferroelectric perovskites including BaTiO_{3}, Bi_{0.5}K_{0.5}TiO_{3} have been developed to obtain morphotropic phase boundaries to enhance the piezoelectric properties of Na_{0.5}Bi_{0.5}TiO_{3}. The extraordinarily large strain generated by a field-induced phase transition in sodium bismuth titanate-based solid solutions prompted researchers to investigate its potential as an alternative to lead zirconate titanate for actuator applications.
