= Ferroelectric polymer =

Group of crystalline polar polymers that are also ferroelectric

Ferroelectric polymers are a group of crystalline polar polymers that are also ferroelectric, meaning that they maintain a permanent electric polarization that can be reversed, or switched, in an external electric field.

Ferroelectric polymers, such as polyvinylidene fluoride (PVDF), are used in acoustic transducers and electromechanical actuators because of their inherent piezoelectric response, and as heat sensors because of their inherent pyroelectric response.

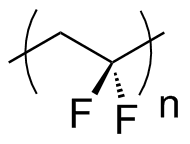
Figure 1: Structure of poly(vinylidene fluoride)

== Background ==
First reported in 1971, ferroelectric polymers are polymer chains that must exhibit ferroelectric behavior, hence piezoelectric and pyroelectric behavior.

A ferroelectric polymer must contain permanent electrical polarization that can be reversed repeatedly, by an opposing electric field. In the polymer, dipoles can be randomly oriented, but application of an electric field will align the dipoles, leading to ferroelectric behavior. In order for this effect to happen, the material must be below its Curie Temperature. Above the Curie Temperature, the polymer exhibits paraelectric behavior, which does not allow for ferroelectric behavior because the electric fields do not align.

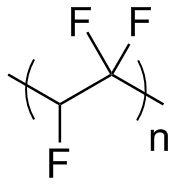
Figure 2: Structure of polytrifluoroethylene

A consequence of ferroelectric behavior leads to piezoelectric behavior, where the polymer will generate an electric field when stress is applied, or change shape upon application of an electric field. This is viewed as shrinking, or changes in conformation of the polymer in an electric field; or by stretching and compressing the polymer, measure generated electric fields. Pyroelectric behavior stems from the change in temperature causing electric behavior of the material. While only ferroelectric behavior is required for a ferroelectric polymer, current ferroelectric polymers exhibit pyroelectric and piezoelectric behavior.

In order to have an electric polarization that can be reversed, ferroelectric polymers are often crystalline, much like other ferroelectric materials. Ferroelectric properties are derived from electrets, which are defined as a dielectric body that polarizes when an electric field and heat is applied. Ferroelectric polymers differ in that the entire body undergoes polarization, and the requirement of heat is not necessary. Although they differ from electrets, they are referred to as electrets often. Ferroelectric polymers fall into a category of ferroelectric materials known as an 'order-disorder' material. This material undergoes a change from randomly oriented dipoles which are paraelectric, to ordered dipoles which become ferroelectric.

After the discovery of PVDF, many other polymers have been sought after that contain ferroelectric, piezoelectric, and pyroelectric properties. Initially different blends and copolymers of PVDF were discovered, such as a polyvinylidene fluoride with poly(methyl methacrylate).

Other structures were discovered to possess ferroelectric properties, such as polytrifluoroethylene and odd-numbered nylon.

== History ==
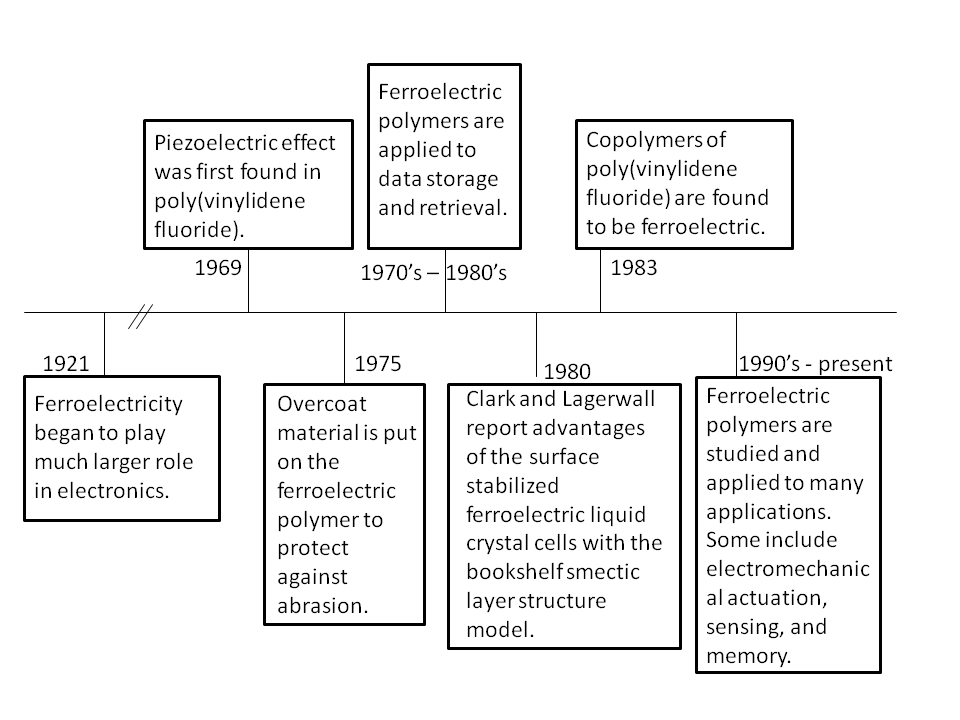
Figure 3: Brief timeline describing important events that have occurred in piezoelectricity and ferroelectric polymer history

The concept of ferroelectricity was first discovered in 1921. This phenomenon began to play a much larger role in electronic applications during the 1950s after the increased use of BaTiO_{3}. This ferroelectric material is part of the corner-sharing oxygen octahedral structure, but ferroelectrics can also be grouped into three other categories. These categories include organic polymers, ceramic polymer composites, and compounds containing hydrogen-bonded radicals. It wasn't until 1969 that Kawai first observed the piezoelectric effect in a polymer polyvinylidene fluoride. Two years later, the ferroelectric properties of the same polymer were reported. Throughout the 1970s and 1980s, these polymers were applied to data storage and retrieval. Subsequently, there has been tremendous growth during the past decade in exploring the materials science, physics, and technology of poly(vinylidenefluoride) and other fluorinated polymers. Copolymer PVDF with trifluoroethylene and odd-numbered nylons were additional polymers that were discovered to be ferroelectric. This propelled a number of developing applications on piezoelectricity and pyroelectricity.

== Polyvinylidene fluoride ==
=== Synthesis ===
Polyvinylidine fluoride is produced by the radical polymerization of vinylidine fluoride.

=== Study of Structure ===
To minimize the potential energy of the chains arising from internal steric and electrostatic interactions, the rotation about single bonds happens in the chain of PVDF. There are two most favorable torsional bond arrangements: trans ( t ) and gauche^{±} ( g^{±} ). In the case of “ t”, the substituents are at 180° to each other. In the case of “g^{±}”, the substituents are at ±60° to each other. PVDF molecules contain two hydrogen and two fluorine atoms per repeat unit, so they have a choice of multiple conformations. However, rotational barriers are relatively high, the chains can be stabilized into favorable conformations other than that of lowest energy. The three known conformations of PVDF are all-trans, tg^{+}tg^{−}, and tttg^{+}tttg^{−}. The first two conformations are the most common ones and are sketched out in the figure on right. In the tg^{+}tg^{−} conformation, the inclination of dipoles to the chain axis leads to the polar components of both perpendicular (4.0 × 10^{−30} C-m per repeat) and parallel to the chain (3.4 × 10^{−30} C-m per repeat). In the all trans structure, the alignment of all its dipoles are in the same direction normal to the chain axis. In this way, it can be expected that the all trans is the most highly polar conformation in PVDF (7.× 10^{−30} C-m per repeat). These polar conformations are the crucial factors that lead to the ferroelectric properties.

== Current research ==
Ferroelectric polymers and other materials have been incorporated into many applications, but there is still cutting edge research that is currently being done. For example, there is research being conducted on novel ferroelectric polymer composites with high dielectric constants. Ferroelectric polymers, such as polyvinylidene fluoride and poly[(vinylidenefluoride-co-trifluoroethylene], are very attractive for many applications because they exhibit good piezoelectric and pyroelectric responses and low acoustic impedance, which matches water and human skin. More importantly, they can be tailored to meet various requirements. A common approach for enhancing the dielectric constant is to disperse a high-dielectric-constant ceramic powder into the polymers. Popular ceramic powders are lead-based complexes such as PbTiO_{3} and Pb(Zr,Ti)O_{3}. This can be disadvantageous because lead can be potentially harmful and at high particulate loading, the polymers lose their flexibility and a low quality composite is obtained. Current advances use a blending procedure to make composites that are based on the simple combination of PVDF and cheap metal powders. Specifically, Ni powders were used to make up the composites. The dielectric constants were enhanced from values there were less than 10 to approximately 400. This large enhancement is explained by the percolation theory.

These ferroelectric materials have also been used as sensors. More specifically, these types of polymers have been used for high pressure and shock compression sensors. It has been discovered that ferroelectric polymers exhibit piezoluminescence upon the application of stress. Piezoluminescence has been looked for in materials that are piezoelectric.

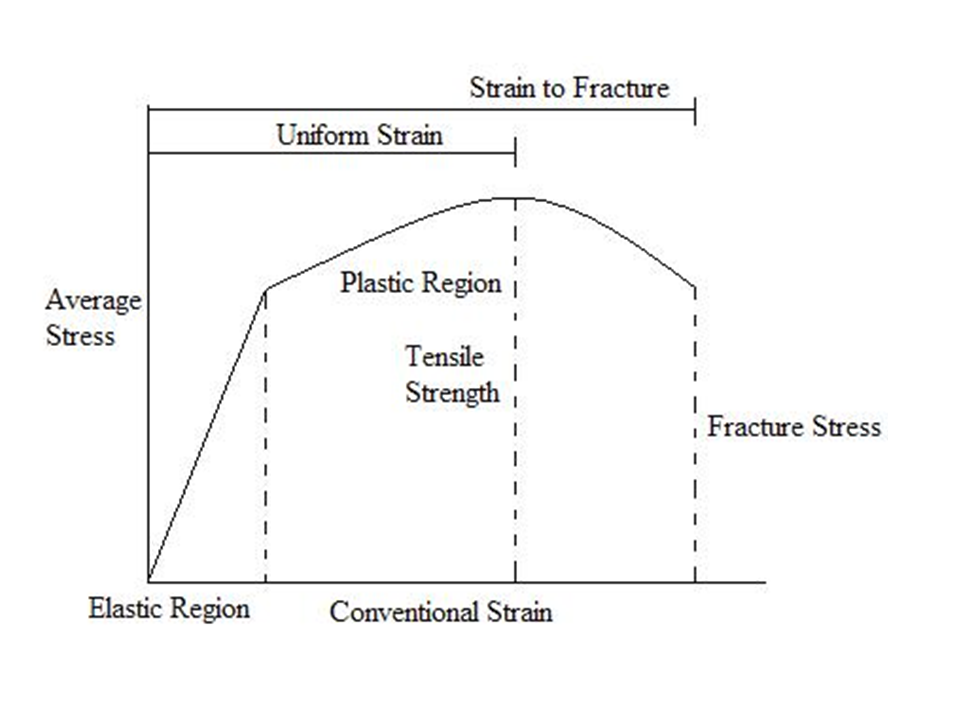
Figure 7: Stress–strain curve showing the different regions. Light seen at fracture is known as triboluminescence and light emitted in the elastic regime is known as piezoluminescence.

It is useful to distinguish among the several regimes in a typical stress–strain curve for a solid material. The three regimes of the stress–strain curve include elastic, plastic, and fracture. Light emitted in the elastic regime is known piezoluminescence. Fig. 7 shows a general stress–strain curve.

These types of polymers have played a role in biomedical and robotic applications and liquid crystalline polymers. In 1974, R.B. Meyer predicted ferroelectricity in chiral smectic liquid crystals by pure symmetry conditions. Shortly after, Clark and Lagerwall had done work on the fast electrooptic effect in a surface-stabilized ferroelectric liquid crystal (SSFLC) structure. This opened up promising possibility of technical applications of ferroelectric liquid crystals in high-information display devices. Through applied research, it was shown that SSFLC structure has faster switching times and bistability behavior in comparison with commonly used nematic liquid crystal displays. In the same time period, the first side-chain liquid crystalline polymers (SCLCP) were synthesized. These comb-like polymers has mesogenic side chains that are covalently bonded (via flexible spacer units) to the polymer backbone. The most important feature of the SCLCP's is their glassy state. In other words, these polymers have a "frozen" ordered state along one axis when cooled below their glass transition temperature. This is advantageous for research in the area of nonlinear optical and optical data storage devices. The disadvantage is that these SCLCP's suffered from their slow switching times due to their high rotational viscosity.

== Applications ==
=== Nonvolatile memory ===
The ferroelectric property exhibits polarization–electric-field-hysteresis loop, which is related to "memory". One application is integrating ferroelectric polymer Langmuir–Blodgett (LB) films with semiconductor technology to produce nonvolatile ferroelectric random-access memory and data-storage devices. Recent research with LB films and more conventional solvent formed films shows that the VDF copolymers (consisting of 70% vinylidene fluoride (VDF) and 30% trifluoroethylene (TrFE)) are promising materials for nonvolatile memory applications. The device is built in the form of the metal–ferroelectric–insulator–semiconductor (MFIS) capacitance memory. The results demonstrated that LB films can provide devices with low-voltage operation.

Thin Film Electronics successfully demonstrated roll-to-roll printed non-volatile memories based on ferroelectric polymers in 2009.

=== Transducers ===
The ferroelectric effect always relates the various force to electric properties, which can be applied in transducers. The flexibility and low cost of polymers facilitates the application of ferroelectric polymers in transducers. The device configuration is simple, it usually consists of a piece of ferroelectric film with an electrode on the top and bottom surfaces. Contacts to the two electrodes complete the design.

==== Sensors ====
When the device functions as a sensor, a mechanical or acoustic force applied to one of the surfaces causes a compression of the material. Via the direct piezoelectric effect, a voltage is generated between the electrodes.

==== Actuators ====
In actuators, a voltage applied between the electrodes causes a strain on the film through the inverse piezoelectric effect.

Soft transducers in the form of ferroelectric polymer foams have been proved to have great potential.

== See also ==
- Polyvinylidene fluoride
- Ferroelectricity
- Piezoelectricity
- Pyroelectricity
