= Lead scandium tantalate =

Lead scandium tantalate (PST) is a mixed oxide of lead, scandium, and tantalum. It has the formula Pb(Sc_{0.5}Ta_{0.5})O_{3}. It is a ceramic material with a perovskite structure, where the Sc and Ta atoms at the B site have an arrangement that is intermediate between ordered and disordered configurations, and can be fine-tuned with thermal treatment. It is ferroelectric at temperatures below 270 K (−3 °C; 26 °F), and is also piezoelectric. Like structurally similar lead zirconate titanate and barium strontium titanate, PST can be used for manufacture of uncooled focal plane array infrared imaging sensors for thermal cameras.
