= Ferroelectric tunnel junction =

A ferroelectric tunnel junction (FTJ) is a form of tunnel junction including a ferroelectric dielectric material sandwiched between two electrically conducting materials. Electrons do not directly pass through the junction, and instead they pass the barrier via quantum tunnelling. The structure is similar to a ferroelectric capacitor, but the ferroelectric layer is fabricated thin enough to enable significant tunneling current. The magnitude of the tunneling current is switched by the ferroelectric polarization and is governed by the tunneling electroresistance (TER).

There exists two conditions that must be met in order to manufacture a reliable FTJ: the FE-layer must be at maximum 3 nm in order to allow the electron tunneling (see section tunneling), and the interfaces on both sides need to be energetically asymmetrical in order to obtain two separate potential barrier heights.

== Description ==
Ferroelectric tunnel junctions are being developed as a memristive component for the semiconductor industry. As of early 2024, FTJ based technologies are not commercially available. To enable sufficient tunneling probability, the ferroelectric layer must be thin enough (in the nanometer scale), rendering many conventional ferroelectric materials redundant. Ferroelectricity as a phenomenon was long thought to disappear in thicknesses required for tunneling, which hindered research around the topic until the 2000s. Since, significant ferroelectricity has been shown in thin films, and FTJs have been successfully shown to follow the proposed working principle.

While most ferroelectric materials require high fabrication temperatures, polycrystalline thin film hafnium oxide has been shown to be ferroelectric even with back-end complementary metal oxide semiconductor (CMOS) compatible fabrication temperatures, rendering FTJs especially interesting for the semiconductor industry.

The hafnium oxide is deposited using atomic layer deposition (ALD) to enable precise growth to form thin enough layers. FTJs have gained significant interest due to the memristive properties as well as CMOS compatible operating voltages and fabrication methods. In addition to ferroelectric tunnel junctions, there are other ferroelectric devices, including ferroelectric capacitors (FeCAP), ferroelectric field-effect transistors (FeFET), ferroelectric random-access memory (FeRAM) and multiferroic tunnel junctions (MFTJ), which are ferroelectric tunnel junction with ferromagnetic materials as the two electrodes.

== Basic operating principle ==
Ferroelectric tunnel junctions are devices where the current through the device can be controlled by the voltage driven across the device. These memristive components use ferroelectric behavior to change the tunneling probability through the device.

=== Ferroelectricity ===
In a simple explanation of ferroelectricity, the electric dipole moments of the crystalline unit cells point first in random directions. As a voltage is driven across the material, these dipole moments rotate to align with the electric field induced by the voltage difference. Once the voltage is lowered back to zero, the dipole moments remain aligned with the previous field. The sum of individual dipole moments form the polarization of the material. In non-ferroelectric materials the polarization relaxes back to zero once the voltage is brought down; in ferroelectric materials the polarization remains. When a voltage of the opposite sign is driven through the same piece of ferroelectric material, the polarization switches to point in the opposite direction. Again, the polarization remains even after the field is reduced to zero. This results in a hysteresis effect seen in the polarization-electric field (PE) curve.

Switching the ferroelectric polarization of the material affects the height of the potential barrier in the device. The potential barrier influences the tunneling probability and thus the current measured, which can be utilized as voltage-controlled memory.

=== Tunneling ===
As the name ferroelectric tunnel junction suggests, the devices operate based on quantum tunneling through a barrier. As electrons tunnel through the barrier, the resulting movement can be measured as current. The amplitude of the current is determined by the tunneling probability.

On the interface of the insulating potential barrier, when the energy of the incident wave is lower than the barrier energy, the wavefunction decays exponentially into the insulator. Depending on the ratio of thickness with respect to the decay constant of the material, there is a chance of tunneling through the material, which is represented as the transmission coefficient:

$T(E) = \exp(-2 \int_{x_1}^{x_2} dx \sqrt{2m (V(x)-E)/\hbar^2} ),$

where $x_1$ and $x_2$ are the edges of the potential barrier, $V(x)$ is the height of the potential barrier at point $x$, $E$ is the energy of the electron, and $m$ is the mass of electron.

In addition to direct tunneling, Fowler-Nordheim tunneling, and thermionic emission contribute to the total current significantly in different operating voltages.

== Current state of research and development ==
As of now, FTJs are CMOS back-end compatible, whereas the front-end compatibility is still under development. Nevertheless, the back-end compatibility allows the integration of FTJs into current silicon semiconductor technology with relatively small investments into new fabrication infrastructure. As computing, due to emergence of machine learning and artificial intelligence, is shifting increasingly from logic-centric into memory-centric computing, the research and development into power efficient, fast, and reliable CMOS compatible non-volatile memory is highly relevant.

Due to the non-destructive readout of the non-volatile memory implemented with FTJs, the components have gained interest in the field of neuromorphic computing. In addition, FTJs exhibit behavior such as accumulative switching, which is promising in hardware implementations of spiking neural networks.

The existence of interfacial layers between the metal and FE material, also known as dead layers, cause changes in device characteristics plaguing the functionality of the device.

== Other tunnel junctions ==
In addition to ferroelectric tunnel junctions, other more established and emerging devices based on the same principles exist. These include:

- Magnetic tunnel junction: the electrons tunnel from one magnetic material to another via a thin insulating barrier.
- Multijunction photovoltaic cell
- Tunnel diode
- Superconducting tunnel junction

Scanning tunneling microscope tip/air/substrate structure can be also viewed as a tunnel junction. Some research has been done with STM tips concerning ferroelectricity, in controlling the domain switching with an STM tip. This is not a ferroelectric tunnel junction since the ferroelectric material does not function as the potential barrier.
