= Photoferroelectric imaging =

Imaging technique using ferroelectric materials

Photoferroelectric imaging is the process of storing an image onto a piece of ferroelectric material by the aid of an applied electric pulse. Stored images are nonvolatile and selectively erasable. Photoferroelectric image storage devices have the advantage of being "extremely simple and easy to fabricate".

Photoferroelectric imaging uses a ferroelectric material's photosensitivity in conjunction with its ferroelectric properties. One type of medium which has been used for photoferroelectric imaging is lead lanthanum zirconate titanate (PLZT) ceramics, which exhibit a good combination of properties for imaging: large electro-optic coefficients, high intrinsic and extrinsic photosensitivities, and nonvolatile memory.

== Process ==
A description of a photoferroelectric imaging process (using PLZT material) is given in the McGraw-Hill Concise Encyclopedia of Science and Technology. In that process, a thin flat plate of transparent, optically polished PLZT material (around 0.25mm thick) was sputter-coated with indium tin oxide (ITO) on both sides, serving as electrodes. Then, the image was exposed onto one of the ITO surfaces, while a voltage pulse was simultaneously applied across the electrodes. The ferroelectric polarization thereby switched from one remanent state to another, and images were "stored both as spatial distributions of light-scattering centers in the bulk of the PLZT and as surface deformation strains which form a relief pattern of the image on the exposed surface." The image may then be viewed directly or indirectly.

This photoferroelectric effect is a type of electro-optic effect. In the example process, the ceramic was poled (Note: Poling means to align dipoles within a material.) to a saturation remanent polarization state by the light (charge carriers were photoexcited across the PLZT's bandgap). The polarization was then switched by the application of the electric field - a phenomenon called photoassisted domain switching.

== Applications ==
Photoferroelectric imaging may be useful in temporary image storage and display. It also has potential applications in data storage and holographic recording.

== See also ==
- Photorefractive effect
- Electro–optic effect
