= Morphotropic phase boundary =

Critical transition region in ferroelectric materials

Morphotropic phase boundary (MPB) is a critical transition region in the composition phase diagram of a piezoelectric or ferroelectric material, where the crystal structure of the material changes abruptly and the electromechanical properties are maximal. It is an important parameter in the design of nonlinear materials with highly nonlinear dielectric and piezoelectric properties. In ferroelectric polymers, it is used to enable a large piezoelectric effect. It is also found in thermoelectric materials.

In piezoelectric polymers, the morphotropic phase boundary refers to the phase transition between tetragonal and rhombohedral ferroelectric phases following a change in composition or mechanical pressure. in some piezoelectric materials like polarized organic piezoelectric materials, it is either not found or rarely found. In these materials, MPB can be induced by using some mechanism, to achieve high performance of piezoelectric effects.
