= Lead zirconate titanate =

Names
- IUPAC name Lead zirconium titanate
- Other names Lead zirconium titanate

Identifiers
CAS Number	12626-81-2
3D model (JSmol)	Interactive image
ChemSpider	140219
ECHA InfoCard	100.032.467
EC Number	235-727-4
PubChem CID	159452
CompTox Dashboard (EPA)	DTXSID00893914
- InChI: InChI=1S/5O.Pb.Ti.Zr/q5*-2;+2;2*+4 Key: AIZivaXCGjchgA4Fj0blZ9rM-N
- SMILES: [O-2].[O-2].[O-2].[O-2].[O-2].[Ti+4].[Zr+4].[Pb+2]

Properties
Chemical formula	Pb[Zr_{x}Ti_{1−x}]O_{3} (0 ≤ x ≤ 1)
Molar mass	303.065 to 346.4222 g/mol

Hazards
- GHS labelling
Pictograms	(GHS07: Exclamation mark) (GHS08: Health hazard) (GHS09: Environmental hazard)
Signal word	Danger
Hazard statements	H302, H332, H360, H373, H410
Precautionary statements	P201, P202, P260, P264, P270, P271, P273, P281, P301+P312, P304+P312, P304+P340, P308+P313, P312, P314, P330, P391, P405, P501
- Except where otherwise noted, data are given for materials in their standard state (at 25 °C [77 °F], 100 kPa). verify (what is ?) Infobox references

Lead zirconate titanate, also called lead zirconium titanate and commonly abbreviated as PZT, is an inorganic compound with the chemical formula Pb[Zr_{x}Ti_{1−x}]O_{3} (0 ≤ x ≤ 1). It is a ceramic perovskite material that shows a marked piezoelectric effect, meaning that the material accumulates an electric charge in response to mechanical stress. The piezoelectric effect is a reversible process: materials exhibiting the piezoelectric effect also exhibit the reverse piezoelectric effect, the internal generation of mechanical strain resulting from an applied electric field. It is used on in a number of practical applications such as ultrasonic transducers and piezoelectric resonators. It is a white to off-white solid.

Lead zirconium titanate was first developed around 1952 at the Tokyo Institute of Technology. Compared to barium titanate, a previously discovered metallic-oxide-based piezoelectric material, lead zirconium titanate exhibits greater sensitivity and has a higher operating temperature. Piezoelectric ceramics are chosen for applications because of their physical strength, chemical inertness and their relatively low manufacturing cost. PZT ceramic is the most commonly used piezoelectric ceramic because it has an even greater sensitivity and higher operating temperature than other piezoceramics.

== Electroceramic properties ==
Being piezoelectric, lead zirconate titanate develops a voltage (or potential difference) across two of its faces when compressed (useful for sensor applications), and physically changes shape when an external electric field is applied (useful for actuator applications). The relative permittivity of lead zirconate titanate can range from 300 to 20000, depending upon orientation and doping.

Being pyroelectric, this material develops a voltage difference across two of its faces under changing temperature conditions; consequently, lead zirconate titanate can be used as a heat sensor. Lead zirconate titanate is also ferroelectric, which means that it has a spontaneous electric polarization (electric dipole) that can be reversed in the presence of an electric field.

The material features an extremely large relative permittivity at the morphotropic phase boundary (MPB) near x = 0.52 at room temperature. At this composition and temperature, there is a coexistence of the tetragonal and rhombohedral phase of PZT. However at temperatures below 250 K, the MPB composition transforms into a monoclinic crystal structure.

Some formulations are ohmic until at least 250 kV/cm (25 MV/m), after which current grows exponentially with field strength before reaching avalanche breakdown; but lead zirconate titanate exhibits time-dependent dielectric breakdown — breakdown may occur under constant-voltage stress after minutes or hours, depending on voltage and temperature, so its dielectric strength depends on the time scale over which it is measured. Other formulations have dielectric strengths measured in the 8–16 MV/m range.

== Uses ==
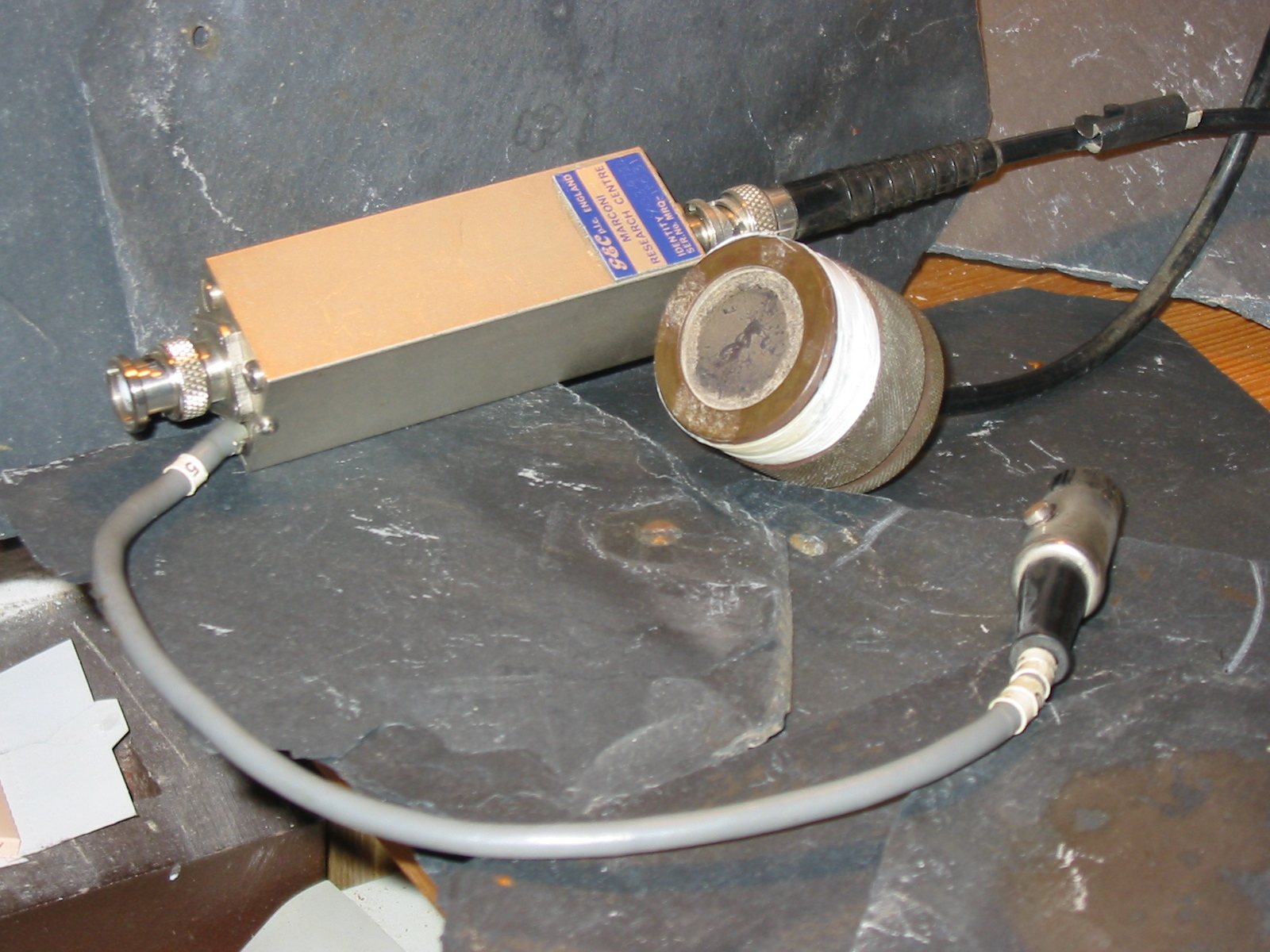
Lead zirconate titanate ultrasound transducer

Lead zirconate titanate-based materials are components of ceramic capacitors and STM/AFM actuators (tubes).

Lead zirconate titanate is used to make ultrasound transducers and other sensors and actuators, as well as high-value ceramic capacitors and FRAM chips. Lead zirconate titanate is also used in the manufacture of ceramic resonators for reference timing in electronic circuitry. Anti-flash goggles featuring PLZT protect aircrew from burns and blindness in case of a nuclear explosion. The PLZT lenses could turn opaque in less than 150 microseconds.

Commercially, it is usually not used in its pure form, rather it is doped with either acceptors, which create oxygen (anion) vacancies, or donors, which create metal (cation) vacancies and facilitate domain wall motion in the material. In general, acceptor doping creates hard lead zirconate titanate, while donor doping creates soft lead zirconate titanate. Hard and soft lead zirconate titanate generally differ in their piezoelectric constants. Piezoelectric constants are proportional to the polarization or to the electrical field generated per unit of mechanical stress, or alternatively is the mechanical strain produced by per unit of electric field applied. In general, soft lead zirconate titanate has a higher piezoelectric constant, but larger losses in the material due to internal friction. In hard lead zirconate titanate, domain wall motion is pinned by the impurities, thereby lowering the losses in the material, but at the expense of a reduced piezoelectric constant.

== Varieties ==
One of the commonly studied chemical composition is PbZr_{0.52}Ti_{0.48}O_{3}. The increased piezoelectric response and poling efficiency near to x = 0.52 is due to the increased number of allowable domain states at the MPB. At this boundary, the 6 possible domain states from the tetragonal phase ⟨100⟩ and the 8 possible domain states from the rhombohedral phase ⟨111⟩ are equally favorable energetically, thereby allowing a maximum 14 possible domain states.

Like structurally similar lead scandium tantalate and barium strontium titanate, lead zirconate titanate can be used for manufacture of uncooled staring array infrared imaging sensors for thermographic cameras. Both thin film (usually obtained by chemical vapor deposition) and bulk structures are used. The formula of the material used usually approaches Pb_{1.1}(Zr_{0.3}Ti_{0.7})O_{3} (called lead zirconate titanate 30/70). Its properties may be modified by doping it with lanthanum, resulting in lanthanum-doped lead zirconium titanate (lead zirconate titanate, also called lead lanthanum zirconium titanate), with formula Pb_{0.83}La_{0.17}(Zr_{0.3}Ti_{0.7})_{0.9575}O_{3} (lead zirconate titanate 17/30/70).

== See also ==
- Polyvinylidene fluoride (PVDF)
- Lithium niobate
