= Antiferroelectricity =

Property of materials with intrinsic electric fields that negate each other

In electromagnetics and materials science, antiferroelectricity is a physical property of certain materials. It is closely related to ferroelectricity; the relation between antiferroelectricity and ferroelectricity is analogous to the relation between antiferromagnetism and ferromagnetism.

An antiferroelectric material consists of an ordered (crystalline) array of electric dipoles (from the ions and electrons in the material), but with adjacent dipoles oriented in opposite (antiparallel) directions (the dipoles of each orientation form interpenetrating sublattices, loosely analogous to a checkerboard pattern). This can be contrasted with a ferroelectric, in which the dipoles all point in the same direction.

In an antiferroelectric, unlike a ferroelectric, the total, macroscopic spontaneous polarization is zero, since the adjacent dipoles cancel each other out.

Antiferroelectricity is a property of a material, and it can appear or disappear (more generally, strengthen or weaken) depending on temperature, pressure, external electric field, growth method, and other parameters. In particular, at a high enough temperature, antiferroelectricity disappears; this temperature is known as the Néel point or Curie point.
