= Lanthanum gallium silicate =

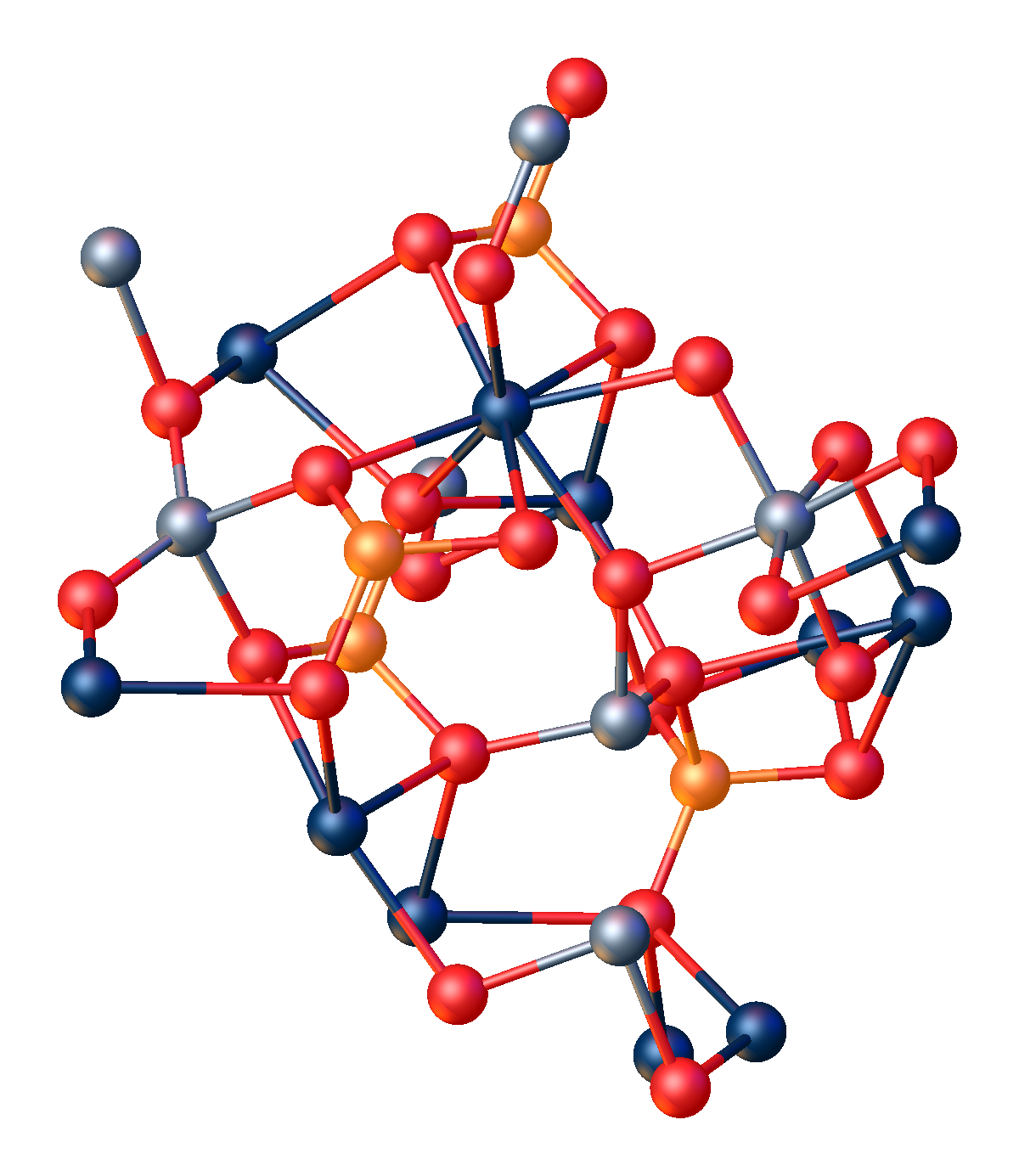

Names
- Other names LGS or langasite

Identifiers
CAS Number	82642-19-1
3D model (JSmol)	Interactive image
- InChI: InChI=1S/5Ga.3La.14O.Si/q8*+3;14*-2;+4 Key: SSZBJIJCKSPUFF-UHFFFAOYSA-N
- SMILES: [Ga+3].[Ga+3].[Ga+3].[Ga+3].[Ga+3].[La+3].[La+3].[La+3].[Si+4].[O-2].[O-2].[O-2].[O-2].[O-2].[O-2].[O-2].[O-2].[O-2].[O-2].[O-2].[O-2].[O-2].[O-2]

Properties
Chemical formula	Ga_{5}La_{3}O_{14}Si
Molar mass	1017.402 g·mol^{−1}
Appearance	colorless solid
Density	5.75 g/cm^{3}
Melting point	1,470 °C (2,680 °F; 1,740 K)
Solubility in water	insoluble
- Except where otherwise noted, data are given for materials in their standard state (at 25 °C [77 °F], 100 kPa). Infobox references

Lanthanum gallium silicate (referred to as LGS in this article), also known as langasite, has a chemical formula of the form A_{3}BC_{3}D_{2}O_{14}, where A, B, C and D indicate particular cation sites. A is a decahedral (Thomson cube) site coordinated by 8 oxygen atoms. B is octahedral site coordinated by 6 oxygen atoms, and C and D are tetrahedral sites coordinated by 4 oxygen atoms. In this material, lanthanum occupied the A-sites, gallium the B, C and half of D-sites, and, silicon the other half of D-sites.

LGS is a piezoelectric material, with no phase transitions up to its melting point of 1470 °C. Single crystal LGS can be grown via the Czochralski method, in which crystallization is initiated on a rotating seed crystal lowered into the melt followed by pulling from the melt. The growth atmosphere is usually argon or nitrogen with up to 5% of oxygen. The use of oxygen in the growth environment is reported to suppress gallium loss from the melt; however, too high an oxygen level can lead to platinum (crucible material used for the melt) dissolution in the melt. The growth of LGS is primarily along the z direction. Currently the 3-inch (76 mm) langasite boules produced commercially have growth rates of 1.5 to 5 mm/h. The quality of the crystals tends to improve as the growth rate is reduced.

== See also ==
- Ceramic
- lanthanum gallium tantalum oxide, langatite (CAS RN 83381-05-9) La_{6}Ga_{11}TaO_{28} (i.e., La_{3}Ga_{5.5}Ta0_{0.5}O_{14})
