= Ferroelectric capacitor =

Ferroelectric capacitor is a capacitor based on a ferroelectric material. In contrast, traditional capacitors are based on dielectric materials. Ferroelectric devices are used in digital electronics as part of ferroelectric RAM, or in analog electronics as tunable capacitors (varactors).

Schematic of a ferroelectric capacitor

In memory applications, the stored value of a ferroelectric capacitor is read by applying an electric field. The amount of charge needed to flip the memory cell to the opposite state is measured and the previous state of the cell is revealed. This means that the read operation destroys the memory cell state, and has to be followed by a corresponding write operation, in order to write the bit back. This makes it similar to (now obsolete) ferrite core memory. The requirement of a write cycle for each read cycle, together with the high but not infinite write cycle limit is a potential problem for some special applications.

== Theory ==
In a short-circuited ferroelectric capacitor with a metal-ferroelectric-metal (MFM) structure, a charge distribution of screening charges forms at the metal-ferroelectric interface so as to screen the electric displacement of the ferroelectric. Due to these screening charges, there is a voltage drop across the ferroelectric capacitor with screening in the electrode layer that can be obtained using the Thomas-Fermi approach as follows:

$V = E_f d + E_e\left(2\lambda\right)$

Here $d$ is the film thickness, $E_f = \frac{V + 8\pi P_s a}{d + \epsilon_f\left(2a\right)}$ and $E_e=\frac{\epsilon_f}{\epsilon_e}E_f - \frac{4\pi}{\epsilon_e}P_s$ are the electric fields in the film and electrode at the interface, $P_s$ is the spontaneous polarization, $a=\frac{\lambda}{\epsilon_e}$, and $\epsilon_f$ & $\epsilon_e$ are the dielectric constants of the film and the metal electrode.

With perfect electrodes, $\lambda=0$ or for thick films, with $d \gg a$ the equation reduces to:

$V = E_f d \Rightarrow E_f=\frac{V}{d}$

== See also ==
- Ferroelectricity
- Ferroelectric RAM
