= Crowd Farm =

The Crowd Farm is a project conceived by MIT students Tad Juscyzk and James Graham and announced at the Holcim Forum 2007 awards ceremony. The goal of the project is to convert the energy of human movement in urban settings to energy suitable for consumer use.

The conception began for Graham experiencing the 2003 New York City blackout and Juscyzk attending Boston's World Cup celebration in City Hall Plaza, as well by an "ingenious little device by Thomas Edison. When visitors came to his house, they passed through a turnstile that pumped water into his holding tank," says Graham. Examples of locations generating large quantities of human movement are commuters in a train station or fans at a concert.

== Concept ==
The idea of a Crowd Farm would work like this: Boston's South Station railway terminal would house a responsive sub-flooring system made up of blocks that depress slightly under the force of human steps would be installed beneath the station's main lobby. The slippage of the blocks against one another as people walked would generate power through the principle of the dynamo, a device that converts the energy of motion into that of an electric current.

The electric current generated by the Crowd Farm could then be used for educational purposes, such as lighting up a sign about energy. Jusczyk stated that people should understand the direct relationship between their movement and the energy produced. A single human step can only power 2 60W light bulbs for 1 flickering second, but a crowd in motion (Boston South station is an estimated 28,527 steps) and the result is enough energy to power a moving train for one second.

=== Initial test ===
The students tested the Venice Biennale, a train station in Torino, Italy. Sitting was used to generate power because the weight of the body on the seat causes a flywheel to spin, which powers a dynamo that, in turn, lights four LEDs.

== Applications ==
Juscyzk and Graham foresee the system being implemented in a modern, energy-conscious building, or to encourage individuals to become less sedentary because of the technology's benefits (both students are avid users of bicycles for transportation).
