= Barium titanate =

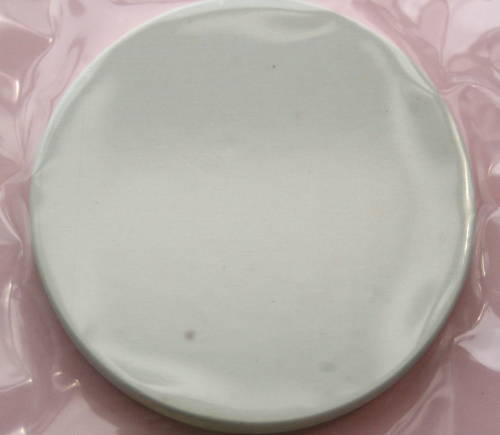
- Barium titanate ceramics in plastic package Polycrystalline BaTiO_{3} in plastic

Identifiers
| CAS Number | 12047-27-7 |
| 3D model (JSmol) | Interactive image |
| ChemSpider | 10605734 |
| ECHA InfoCard | 100.031.783 |
| EC Number | 234-975-0 |
| PubChem CID | 6101006 |
| RTECS number | XR1437333 |
| UNII | 73LKE302QO |
| CompTox Dashboard (EPA) | DTXSID20892161 |
- InChI: InChI=1S/2Ba.4O.Ti/q2*+2;4*-1; Key: JRPBQTZRNDNNOP-UHFFFAOYSA-N; InChI=1/2Ba.4O.Ti/q2*+2;4*-1;/r2Ba.O4Ti/c;;1-5(2,3)4/q2*+2;-4 Key: JRPBQTZRNDNNOP-NXYSCRTKAD
- SMILES: [Ba+2].[Ba+2].[O-][Ti]([O-])([O-])[O-]

Properties
| Chemical formula | BaTiO_{3} |
| Molar mass | 233.192 g/mol |
| Appearance | White crystals |
| Odor | Odorless |
| Density | 6.02 g/cm^{3}, solid |
| Melting point | 1,625 °C (2,957 °F; 1,898 K) |
| Solubility in water | Insoluble |
| Solubility | Slightly soluble in dilute mineral acids; dissolves in concentrated hydrofluoric acid |
| Band gap | 3.2 eV (300 K, single crystal) |
| Refractive index (n_{D}) | n_{o} = 2.412; n_{e} = 2.360 |

Structure
| Crystal structure | Tetragonal, tP5 |
| Space group | P4mm, No. 99 |

Hazards
- GHS labelling
| Pictograms | (GHS07: Exclamation mark) |
| Signal word | Warning |
| Hazard statements | H302, H332 |
- Except where otherwise noted, data are given for materials in their standard state (at 25 °C [77 °F], 100 kPa). verify (what is ?) Infobox references

Barium titanate (BTO) is an inorganic compound with chemical formula BaTiO_{3}. It is the barium salt of metatitanic acid. Barium titanate appears white as a powder and is transparent when prepared as large crystals. It is a ferroelectric, pyroelectric, and piezoelectric ceramic material that exhibits the photorefractive effect. It is used in capacitors, electromechanical transducers and nonlinear optics.

== History ==
The development of barium titanate as a dielectric material was primarily motivated by the critical shortage of mica (previously the standard material for capacitors) during the onset of World War II. As German blockades disrupted global supply chains, international research efforts intensified to identify synthetic alternatives with high dielectric constants. In 1940, Westinghouse Research Laboratories explored combining titanium dioxide with alkali earth metal oxides, and showed that the highest dielectric constants could be achieved by using barium oxide combined with rutile, forming BaTiO_{3}. Later on, ferroelectric switching in BaTiO_{3} was demonstrated by Arthur R. von Hippel in 1945.

== Structure ==
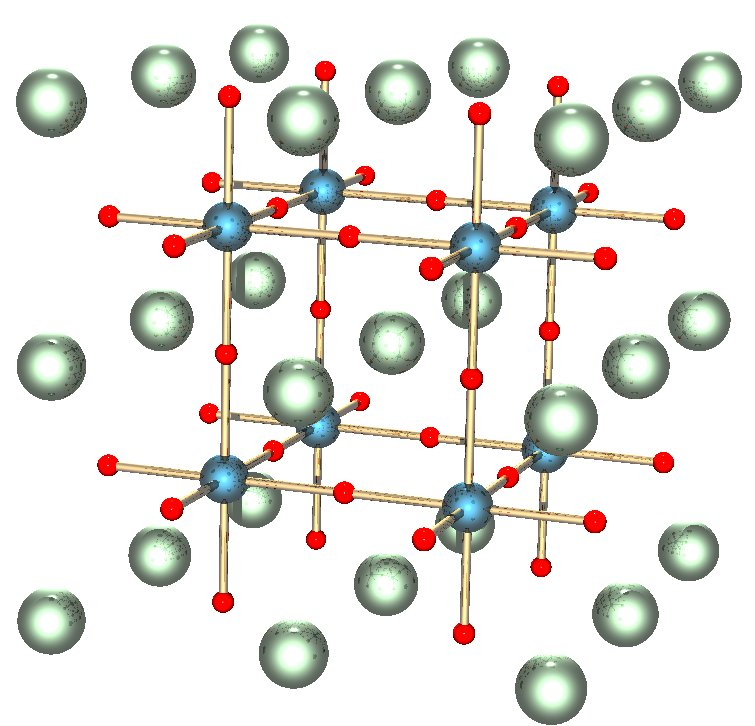
Structure of cubic BaTiO_{3}. The red spheres are oxide centres, blue are Ti^{4+} cations, and the green spheres are Ba^{2+}.

The solid exists in one of four polymorphs depending on temperature. From high to low temperature, these crystal symmetries of the four polymorphs are cubic, tetragonal, orthorhombic and rhombohedral crystal structure. All of these phases exhibit the ferroelectric effect apart from the cubic phase. The high temperature cubic phase is easiest to describe, as it consists of regular corner-sharing octahedral TiO_{6} units that define a cube with O vertices and Ti-O-Ti edges. In the cubic phase, Ba^{2+} is located at the center of the cube, with a nominal coordination number of 12. Lower symmetry phases are stabilized at lower temperatures and involve movement of the Ti^{4+} to off-center positions. The remarkable properties of this material arise from the cooperative behavior of the Ti^{4+} distortions.

Above the melting point, the liquid has a remarkably different local structure to the solid forms, with the majority of Ti^{4+} coordinated to four oxygen, in tetrahedral TiO_{4} units, which coexist with more highly coordinated units.

== Production and handling properties ==
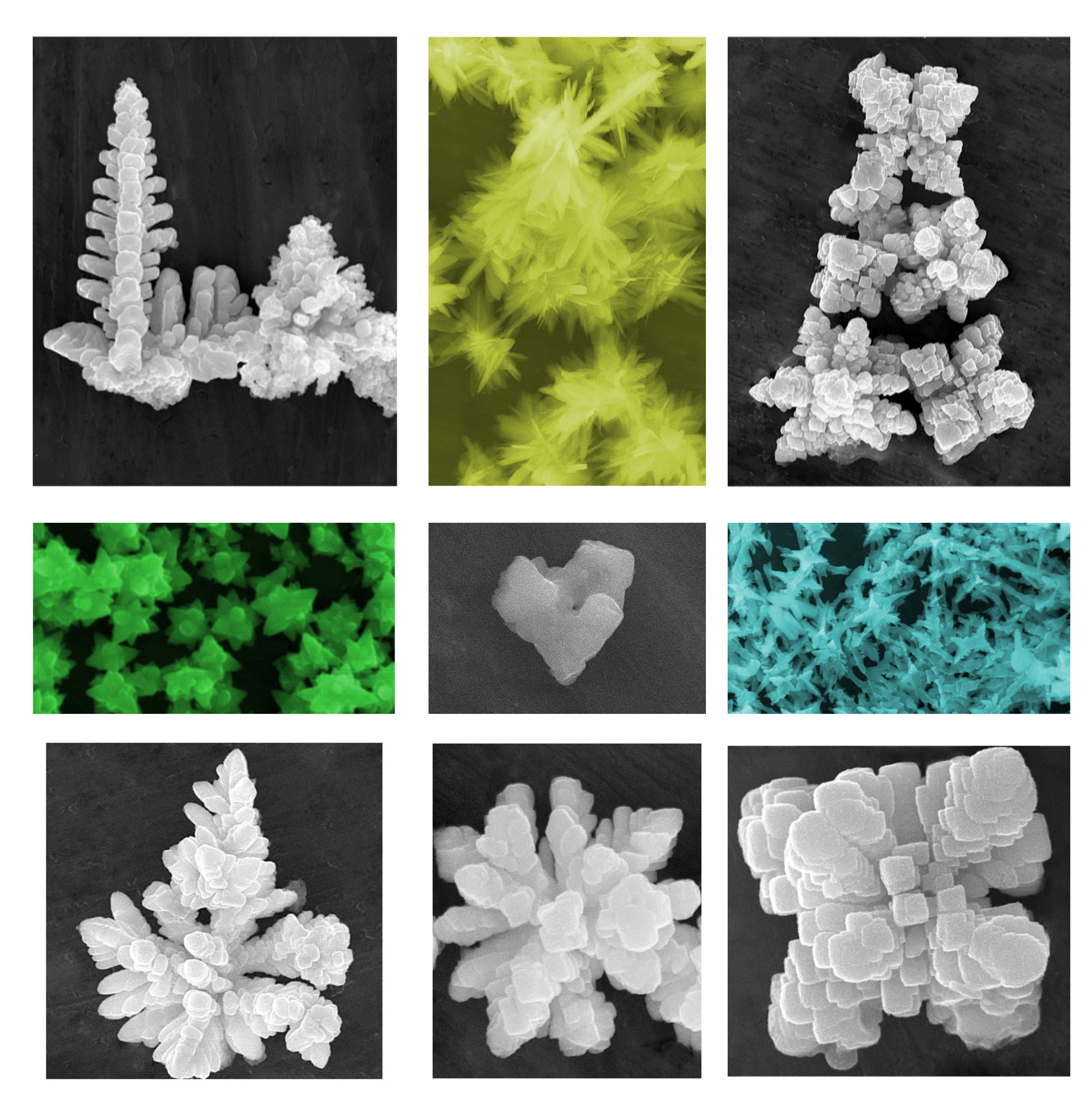
Scanning Electron Microscopy (SEM) images showing particles of BaTiO_{3}. The different morphologies depend on the synthesis conditions (precipitation, hydrothermal and solvothermal synthesis): size and shape can be varied by changing the concentration of precursors, the reaction temperature and the time. Color (if added) helps to emphasize the grayscale levels. In general, the synthesis of Barium titanate by precipitation from aqueous solution allows to produce particles with spherical shape with size that can be tailored from a few nanometers to several hundred nanometers by decreasing the concentration of reactants. At very low concentration the particles have the tendency to develop a dendritic-like morphology, as reported in the images.

Barium titanate can be synthesized by the relatively simple sol-hydrothermal method. Barium titanate can also be manufactured by heating barium carbonate and titanium dioxide. The reaction proceeds via liquid phase sintering. Single crystals can be grown at around 1100 °C from molten potassium fluoride. Other materials are often added as dopants, e.g., Sr to form solid solutions with strontium titanate. Barium titanate reacts with nitrogen trichloride and produces a greenish or gray mixture; the ferroelectric properties of the mixture are still present in this form.

Much effort has been spent studying the relationship between particle morphology and its properties. Barium titanate is one of the few ceramic compounds known to exhibit abnormal grain growth, in which large faceted grains grow in a matrix of finer grains, with profound implications on densification and physical properties. Fully dense nanocrystalline barium titanate has 40% higher permittivity than the same material prepared in classic ways. The addition of inclusions of barium titanate to tin has been shown to produce a bulk material with a higher viscoelastic stiffness than that of diamonds. Barium titanate goes through two phase transitions that change the crystal shape and volume. This phase change leads to composites where the barium titanates have a negative bulk modulus (Young's modulus), meaning that when a force acts on the inclusions, there is displacement in the opposite direction, further stiffening the composite.

Like many oxides, barium titanate is insoluble in water but attacked by sulfuric acid. It is also soluble in concentrated hydrochloric acid, and hydrofluoric acid. Its bulk room-temperature bandgap is 3.2 eV, but this increases to ~3.5 eV when the particle size is reduced from about 15 to 7 nm.

== Uses ==
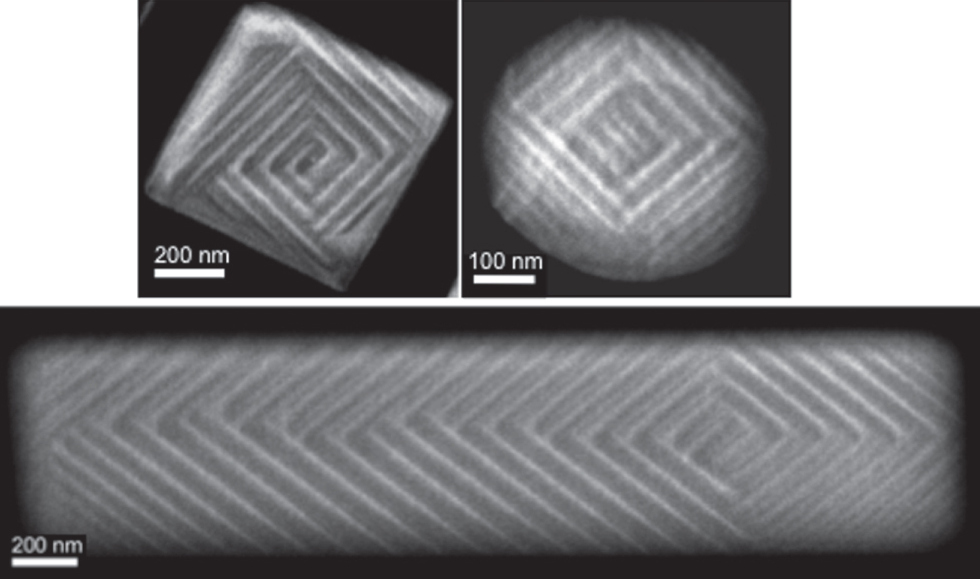
Scanning transmission electron microscopy of the ferroelastic domains that form in BaTiO_{3} on cooling through the Curie temperature. The vertex point, where domain bundles meet, moves from the center in isometric crystals (top) to off-center in oblongs (bottom).

Barium titanate is a dielectric ceramic used in capacitors, with dielectric constant values as high as 7,000. Over a narrow temperature range, values as high as 15,000 are possible; most common ceramic and polymer materials are less than 10, while others, such as titanium dioxide (TiO_{2}), have values between 20 and 70. High-purity barium titanate powder is reported to be a key component of new barium titanate capacitor energy storage systems for use in electric vehicles.

It is a piezoelectric material used in microphones and other transducers, albeit largely replaced by lead zirconate titanate. The spontaneous polarization of barium titanate single crystals at room temperature range between 0.15 C/m^{2} in earlier studies, and 0.26 C/m^{2} in more recent publications, and its Curie temperature is between 120 and 130 °C. The differences are related to the growth technique, with earlier flux grown crystals being less pure than current crystals grown with the Czochralski process, which therefore have a larger spontaneous polarization and a higher Curie temperature.

Barium titanate crystals find use in nonlinear optics. The material has high beam-coupling gain, and can be operated at visible and near-infrared wavelengths. It has the highest reflectivity of the materials used for self-pumped phase conjugation (SPPC) applications. It can be used for continuous-wave four-wave mixing with milliwatt-range optical power. For photorefractive applications, barium titanate can be doped by various other elements, e.g. iron. Thin films of barium titanate display electrooptic modulation to frequencies over 40 GHz.

The pyroelectric and ferroelectric properties of barium titanate are used in some types of uncooled sensors for thermal cameras.

Polycrystalline barium titanate has a positive temperature coefficient of resistance, making it a useful material for thermistors and self-regulating electric heating systems. For these applications, barium titanate is manufactured with dopants to give the material semiconductor properties. Specific applications include overcurrent protection for motors, ballasts for fluorescent lights, automobile cabin air heaters, and consumer space heaters.

Due to their elevated biocompatibility, barium titanate nanoparticles (BTNPs) have been recently employed as nanocarriers for drug delivery.

Magnetoelectric effect of giant strengths have been reported in thin films grown on barium titanate substrates.

== Natural occurrence ==
Barioperovskite is a very rare natural analogue of BaTiO_{3}, found as microinclusions in benitoite.

== See also ==
- Strontium titanate
- Lead zirconate titanate
