= Ferroelectricity =

Property of materials which both possess and are affected by electric fields

In physics and materials science, ferroelectricity is the property of certain materials that exhibit a spontaneous electric polarization—an internal electric alignment that arises naturally without an external source. This polarization can be reversed when an external electric field is applied.

All ferroelectric materials are also piezoelectric (they generate an electric charge when mechanically stressed) and pyroelectric (they generate a charge when heated or cooled). Their distinctive feature is that the natural electrical polarization is reversible.

The term ferroelectricity was coined in analogy to ferromagnetism, where a material exhibits a permanent magnetic moment. Ferromagnetism was already well established when ferroelectricity was first observed in 1920 in Rochelle salt by American physicist Joseph Valasek. The prefix ferro (meaning iron) was adopted even though most ferroelectric materials do not contain iron.

Materials that are both ferroelectric and ferromagnetic are known as multiferroics, and they are of particular interest because they combine electric and magnetic ordering in a single system.

== Polarization ==
Linear dielectric polarization

Paraelectric polarization

Ferroelectric polarization

When most materials are electrically polarized, the induced polarization P is almost exactly proportional to the applied external electric field E, so the polarization is a linear function. This is called linear dielectric polarization (see figure). Some materials, known as paraelectric materials, show a more enhanced nonlinear polarization (see figure). The electric permittivity, corresponding to the slope of the polarization curve, is not constant as in linear dielectrics but is a function of the external electric field.

In addition to being nonlinear, ferroelectric materials demonstrate a spontaneous nonzero polarization (after entrainment, see figure) even when the applied field E is zero. The distinguishing feature of ferroelectrics is that the spontaneous polarization can be reversed by a suitably strong applied electric field in the opposite direction; the polarization is therefore dependent not only on the current electric field but also on its history, yielding a hysteresis loop. They are called ferroelectrics by analogy to ferromagnetic materials, which have spontaneous magnetization and exhibit similar hysteresis loops.

Typically, materials demonstrate ferroelectricity only below a certain phase transition temperature, called the Curie temperature (T_{C}), and are paraelectric above this temperature: the spontaneous polarization vanishes, and the ferroelectric crystal transforms into the paraelectric state. Many ferroelectrics lose their pyroelectric properties above T_{C} completely, because their paraelectric phase has a centrosymmetric crystal structure.

== Applications ==
The nonlinear nature of ferroelectric materials can be used to make capacitors with adjustable capacitance. Typically, a ferroelectric capacitor simply consists of a pair of electrodes sandwiching a layer of ferroelectric material. The permittivity of ferroelectrics is not only adjustable but commonly also very high, especially when close to the phase transition temperature. Because of this, ferroelectric capacitors are small in physical size compared to dielectric (non-tunable) capacitors of similar capacitance.

The spontaneous polarization of ferroelectric materials implies a hysteresis effect which can be used as a memory function, and ferroelectric capacitors are indeed used to make ferroelectric RAM for computers and RFID cards. In these applications thin films of ferroelectric materials are typically used, as this allows the field required to switch the polarization to be achieved with a moderate voltage. However, when using thin films a great deal of attention needs to be paid to the interfaces, electrodes and sample quality for devices to work reliably.

Ferroelectric materials are required by symmetry considerations to also be piezoelectric and pyroelectric. The combined properties of memory, piezoelectricity, and pyroelectricity make ferroelectric capacitors very useful, e.g. for sensor applications. Ferroelectric capacitors are used in medical ultrasound machines (the capacitors generate and then listen for the ultrasound ping used to image the internal organs of a body), high quality infrared cameras (the infrared image is projected onto a two dimensional array of ferroelectric capacitors capable of detecting temperature differences as small as millionths of a degree Celsius), fire sensors, sonar, vibration sensors, and even fuel injectors on diesel engines.

Another idea of recent interest is the ferroelectric tunnel junction (FTJ) in which a contact is made up by nanometer-thick ferroelectric film placed between metal electrodes. The thickness of the ferroelectric layer is small enough to allow tunneling of electrons. The piezoelectric and interface effects as well as the depolarization field may lead to a giant electroresistance (GER) switching effect.

Yet another burgeoning application is multiferroics, where researchers are looking for ways to couple magnetic and ferroelectric ordering within a material or heterostructure; there are several recent reviews on this topic.

Catalytic properties of ferroelectrics have been studied since 1952 when Parravano observed anomalies in CO oxidation rates over ferroelectric sodium and potassium niobates near the Curie temperature of these materials. Surface-perpendicular component of the ferroelectric polarization can dope polarization-dependent charges on surfaces of ferroelectric materials, changing their chemistry. This opens the possibility of performing catalysis beyond the limits of the Sabatier principle. Sabatier principle states that the surface-adsorbates interaction has to be an optimal amount: not too weak to be inert toward the reactants and not too strong to poison the surface and avoid desorption of the products: a compromise situation. This set of optimum interactions is usually referred to as "top of the volcano" in activity volcano plots. On the other hand, ferroelectric polarization-dependent chemistry can offer the possibility of switching the surface—adsorbates interaction from strong adsorption to strong desorption, thus a compromise between desorption and adsorption is no longer needed. Ferroelectric polarization can also act as an energy harvester. Polarization can help the separation of photo-generated electron-hole pairs, leading to enhanced photocatalysis. Also, due to pyroelectric and piezoelectric effects under varying temperature (heating/cooling cycles) or varying strain (vibrations) conditions extra charges can appear on the surface and drive various (electro)chemical reactions forward.

Photoferroelectric imaging is a technique to record optical information on pieces of ferroelectric material. The images are nonvolatile and selectively erasable.

== Materials ==
The internal electric dipoles of a ferroelectric material are coupled to the material lattice so anything that changes the lattice will change the strength of the dipoles (in other words, a change in the spontaneous polarization). The change in the spontaneous polarization results in a change in the surface charge. This can cause current flow in the case of a ferroelectric capacitor even without the presence of an external voltage across the capacitor. Two stimuli that will change the lattice dimensions of a material are force and temperature. The generation of a surface charge in response to the application of an external stress to a material is called piezoelectricity. A change in the spontaneous polarization of a material in response to a change in temperature is called pyroelectricity.

Generally, there are 230 space groups among which 32 crystalline classes can be found in crystals. There are 21 non-centrosymmetric classes, within which 20 are piezoelectric. Among the piezoelectric classes, 10 have a spontaneous electric polarization which varies with temperature; thus they are pyroelectric. Ferroelectricity is a subset of pyroelectricity, which brings spontaneous electronic polarization to the material.

32 Crystalline classes
21 noncentrosymmetric			11 centrosymmetric
20 classes piezoelectric			non piezoelectric
10 classes pyroelectric		non pyroelectric	non piezoelectric
ferroelectric	non ferroelectric	non pyroelectric	non piezoelectric
e.g. : PbZr/TiO_{3}, BaTiO_{3}, PbTiO_{3}, AlN	e.g. : Tourmaline, ZnO,	e.g. : Quartz, Langasite	non piezoelectric

Ferroelectric phase transitions are often characterized as either displacive (such as BaTiO_{3}) or order-disorder (such as NaNO_{2}), though often phase transitions will demonstrate elements of both behaviors. In barium titanate, a typical ferroelectric of the displacive type, the transition can be understood in terms of a polarization catastrophe, in which, if an ion is displaced from equilibrium slightly, the force from the local electric fields due to the ions in the crystal increases faster than the elastic-restoring forces. This leads to an asymmetrical shift in the equilibrium ion positions and hence to a permanent dipole moment. The ionic displacement in barium titanate concerns the relative position of the titanium ion within the oxygen octahedral cage. In lead titanate, another key ferroelectric material, although the structure is rather similar to barium titanate the driving force for ferroelectricity is more complex with interactions between the lead and oxygen ions also playing an important role. In an order-disorder ferroelectric, there is a dipole moment in each unit cell, but at high temperatures they are pointing in random directions. Upon lowering the temperature and going through the phase transition, the dipoles order, all pointing in the same direction within a domain.

An important ferroelectric material for applications is lead zirconate titanate (PZT), which is part of the solid solution formed between ferroelectric lead titanate and anti-ferroelectric lead zirconate. Different compositions are used for different applications; for memory applications, PZT closer in composition to lead titanate is preferred, whereas piezoelectric applications make use of the diverging piezoelectric coefficients associated with the morphotropic phase boundary that is found close to the 50/50 composition.

Ferroelectric crystals often show several transition temperatures and domain structure hysteresis, much as do ferromagnetic crystals. The nature of the phase transition in some ferroelectric crystals is still not well understood.

In 1974 R.B. Meyer used symmetry arguments to predict ferroelectric liquid crystals, and the prediction could immediately be verified by several observations of behavior connected to ferroelectricity in smectic liquid-crystal phases that are chiral and tilted. The technology allows the building of flat-screen monitors. Mass production between 1994 and 1999 was carried out by Canon. Ferroelectric liquid crystals are used in production of reflective LCoS.

In 2010 David Field found that prosaic films of chemicals such as nitrous oxide or propane exhibited ferroelectric properties. This new class of ferroelectric materials exhibit "spontelectric" properties, and may have wide-ranging applications in device and nano-technology and also influence the electrical nature of dust in the interstellar medium.

Other ferroelectric materials used include triglycine sulfate, polyvinylidene fluoride (PVDF) and lithium tantalate. A single atom thick ferroelectric monolayer can be created using pure bismuth.

It should be possible to produce materials which combine both ferroelectric and metallic properties simultaneously, at room temperature. According to research published in 2018 in Nature Communications, scientists were able to produce a two-dimensional sheet of material which was both ferroelectric (had a polar crystal structure) and which conducted electricity.

== Theory ==
An introduction to Landau theory can be found here. Based on Ginzburg–Landau theory, the free energy of a ferroelectric material, in the absence of an electric field and applied stress may be written as a Taylor expansion in terms of the order parameter, P. If a sixth order expansion is used (i.e. 8th order and higher terms truncated), the free energy is given by:

$$\begin{align}
\Delta E =&\quad\, \tfrac{1}{2}\alpha_0 (T - T_0) (P_x^2 + P_y^2 + P_z^2) \\[4pt]
&+ \tfrac{1}{4} \alpha_{11} (P_x^4 + P_y^4 + P_z^4) \\[4pt]
&+ \tfrac{1}{2} \alpha_{12} (P_x^2 P_y^2 + P_y^2 P_z^2 + P_z^2P_x^2) \\[4pt]
&+ \tfrac{1}{6} \alpha_{111} (P_x^6 + P_y^6 + P_z^6) \\[4pt]
&+ \tfrac{1}{2} \alpha_{112} \bigl[ P_x^4(P_y^2 + P_z^2)
+ P_y^4(P_x^2 + P_z^2) + P_z^4(P_x^2 + P_y^2) \bigr] \\[4pt]
&+ \tfrac{1}{2} \alpha_{123} P_x^2P_y^2P_z^2
\end{align}$$

where P_{x}, P_{y}, P_{z} are the components of the polarization vector in the x, y, z directions respectively, and the coefficients, α_{i}, α_{ij}, α_{ijk} must be consistent with the crystal symmetry. To investigate domain formation and other phenomena in ferroelectrics, these equations are often used in the context of a phase field model. Typically, this involves adding a gradient term, an electrostatic term and an elastic term to the free energy. The equations are then discretized onto a grid using the finite difference method or finite element method and solved subject to the constraints of Gauss's law and Linear elasticity.

In all known ferroelectrics, α_{0} > 0 and α_{111} > 0. These coefficients may be obtained experimentally or from ab-initio simulations. For ferroelectrics with a first order phase transition, α_{11} < 0, whereas α_{11} > 0 for a second order phase transition.

The spontaneous polarization, P_{s} of a ferroelectric for a cubic to tetragonal phase transition may be obtained by considering the 1D expression of the free energy which is:

$$\Delta E = \tfrac{1}{2}\alpha_0 (T-T_0)P_x^2 + \tfrac{1}{4}\alpha_{11}P_x^4 + \tfrac{1}{6}\alpha_{111}P_x^6$$

This free energy has the shape of a double well potential with two free energy minima at P_{x} = P_{s}, the spontaneous polarization. We find the derivative of the free energy, and set it equal to zero in order to solve for P_{s}:

$$\begin{align}
\frac{\partial \Delta E}{\partial P_x} &= \alpha_0(T-T_0)P_x + \alpha_{11}P_x^3 + \alpha_{111}P_x^5 \\[4pt]
\implies 0 = \frac{\partial \Delta E}{\partial P_x} &= P_s \bigl[ \alpha_0(T-T_0) + \alpha_{11}P_s^2 + \alpha_{111}P_s^4 \bigr]
\end{align}$$

Since the P_{s} = 0 solution of this equation rather corresponds to a free energy maxima in the ferroelectric phase, the desired solutions for P_{s} correspond to setting the remaining factor to zero:
$$\alpha_0(T-T_0) + \alpha_{11}P_s^2 + \alpha_{111}P_s^4 = 0$$

whose solution is:

$$P_s^2 = \frac{1}{2\alpha_{111}} \left[-\alpha_{11} \pm \sqrt{\alpha_{11}^2 + 4\alpha_0\alpha_{111} (T_0-T)} \;\right]$$

and eliminating solutions which take the square root of a negative number (for either the first or second order phase transitions) gives:

$$P_s = \pm \sqrt{\frac{1}{2\alpha_{111}} \left[-\alpha_{11}+\sqrt{\alpha_{11}^2 + 4\alpha_0\alpha_{111} (T_0-T)} \;\right]}$$

If $\alpha_{11}=0$, the solution for the spontaneous polarization reduces to:

$$P_s = \pm\sqrt[4]{\frac{\alpha_0 (T_0-T)}{\alpha_{111}}}$$

The hysteresis loop (P_{x} versus E_{x}) may be obtained from the free energy expansion by including the term −E_{x}P_{x} corresponding to the energy due to an external electric field E_{x} interacting with the polarization P_{x}, as follows:

$$\Delta E = \tfrac{1}{2} \alpha_0(T-T_0)P_x^2 + \tfrac{1}{4} \alpha_{11}P_x^4 + \tfrac{1}{6} \alpha_{111}P_x^6 - E_x P_x$$

We find the stable polarization values of P_{x} under the influence of the external field, now denoted as P_{e}, again by setting the derivative of the energy with respect to P_{x} to zero:
$$\begin{align}
\frac{\partial \Delta E}{\partial P_x} &= \alpha_0(T-T_0)P_x + \alpha_{11}P_x^3 + \alpha_{111}P_x^5 - E_x = 0 \\[4pt]
E_x &= \alpha_0(T-T_0)P_e + \alpha_{11}P_e^3 + \alpha_{111}P_e^5
\end{align}$$

Plotting E_{x} (on the X axis) as a function of P_{e} (but on the Y axis) gives an S-shaped curve which is multi-valued in P_{e} for some values of E_{x}. The central part of the 'S' corresponds to a free energy local maximum (since $\tfrac{\partial^2 \Delta E}{\partial P_x^2}<0$ ). Elimination of this region, and connection of the top and bottom portions of the 'S' curve by vertical lines at the discontinuities gives the hysteresis loop of internal polarization due to an external electric field.

== Sliding ferroelectricity ==
Sliding ferroelectricity is widely found but only in two-dimensional (2D) van der Waals stacked layers. The vertical electric polarization is switched by in-plane interlayer sliding.

== See also ==
- Category:Ferroelectric materials
- Ferroelectric capacitor
- Ferroelectric RAM – Novel type of computer memory
- Ferroelectric polymer – Group of crystalline polar polymers that are also ferroelectric
- Piezoresponse force microscopy – Microscopy technique for piezoelectric materials
- Photoferroelectric imaging – Imaging technique using ferroelectric materials

Physics

- Paraelectricity – Electrically insulating substance able to be polarised by an applied electric field
- Piezoelectricity – Electric charge generated in certain solids due to mechanical stress
- Pyroelectricity – Voltage created when a crystal is heated
- Antiferroelectricity – Property of materials with intrinsic electric fields that negate each other
- Ferroelasticity – Electromagnetic phenomenon
- Flexoelectricity – Polarization due to a strain gradient
- Condensed matter physics – Branch of physics
- Spintronics – Solid-state electronics based on electron spin
- Ceramic – Inorganic, nonmetallic solid prepared by the action of heats
- Multiferroics – Materials which exhibit ferromagnetism, ferroelectricity, and/or ferroelasticity

Lists

- Electrical phenomena – Phenomena involving electrical occurrences
- Outline of physics – Overview of and topical guide to physics
- Index of electronics articles
