= Pyroelectricity =

Voltage created when a crystal is heated

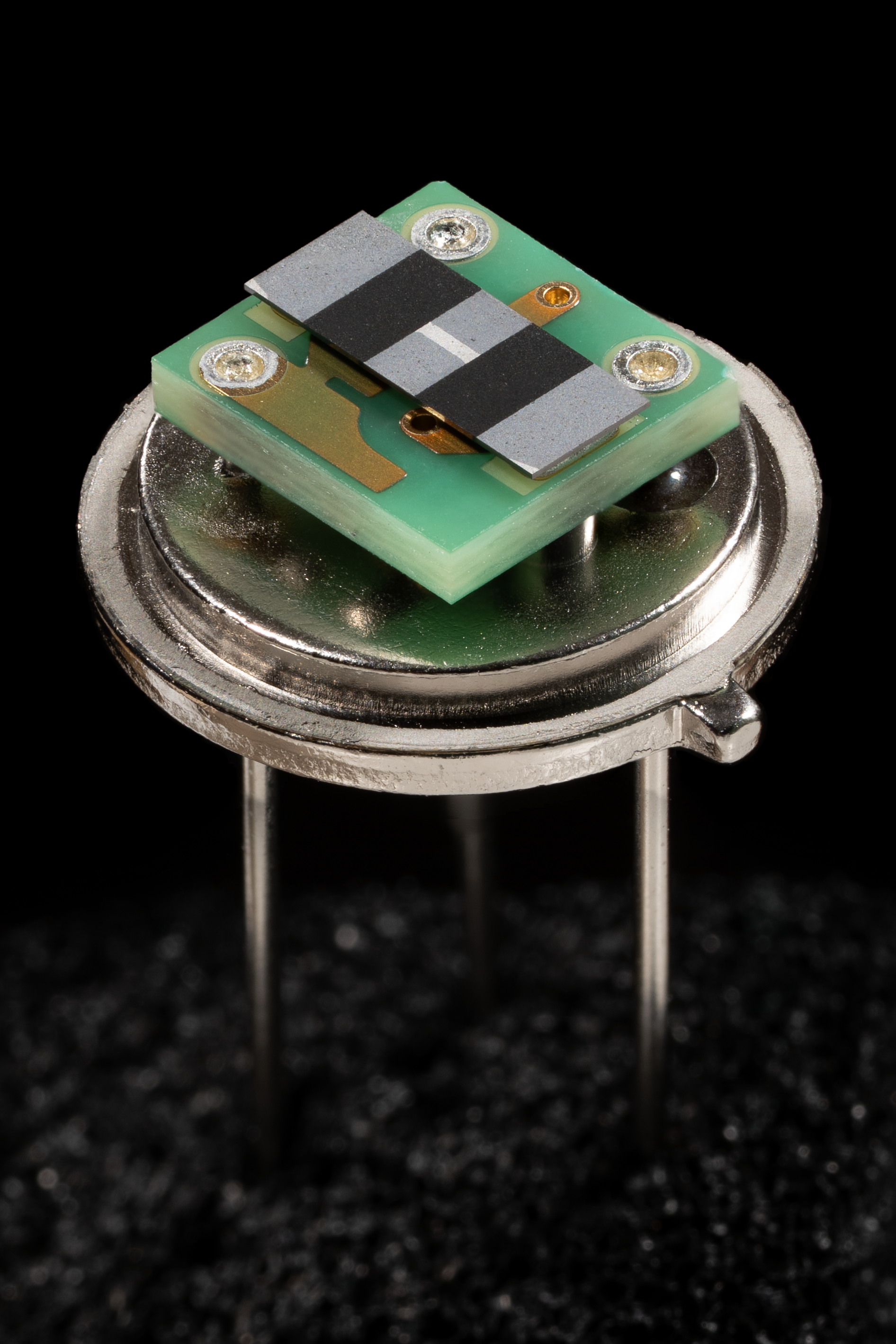
Internals of a pyroelectric sensor

Pyroelectricity (from Greek: pyr (πυρ), "fire" and electricity) is a property of certain crystals which are naturally electrically polarized and as a result contain large electric fields. Pyroelectricity can be described as the ability of certain materials to generate a temporary voltage when they are heated or cooled. The change in temperature modifies the positions of the atoms slightly within the crystal structure, so that the polarization of the material changes. This polarization change gives rise to a voltage across the crystal. If the temperature stays constant at its new value, the pyroelectric voltage gradually disappears due to leakage current. The leakage can be due to electrons moving through the crystal, ions moving through the air, or current leaking through a voltmeter attached across the crystal.

== Explanation ==
Pyroelectric charge in minerals develops on the opposite faces of asymmetric crystals. The direction in which the propagation of the charge tends is usually constant throughout a pyroelectric material, but, in some materials, this direction can be changed by a nearby electric field. These materials are said to exhibit ferroelectricity.

All known pyroelectric materials are also piezoelectric, but not all piezoelectric crystals are pyroelectric. Despite being pyroelectric, novel materials such as boron aluminum nitride (BAlN) and boron gallium nitride (BGaN) have zero piezoelectric response for strain along the c-axis at certain compositions, the two properties being closely related. However, note that some piezoelectric materials have a crystal symmetry that does not allow pyroelectricity.

Pyroelectric materials are mostly hard and crystals; however, soft pyroelectricity can be achieved by using electrets.

Pyroelectricity is measured as the change in net polarization (a vector) proportional to a change in temperature. The total pyroelectric coefficient measured at constant stress is the sum of the pyroelectric coefficients at constant strain (primary pyroelectric effect) and the piezoelectric contribution from thermal expansion (secondary pyroelectric effect). Under normal circumstances, even polar materials do not display a net dipole moment. As a consequence, there are no electric dipole equivalents of bar magnets because the intrinsic dipole moment is neutralized by "free" electric charge that builds up on the surface by internal conduction or from the ambient atmosphere. Polar crystals only reveal their nature when perturbed in some fashion that momentarily upsets the balance with the compensating surface charge.

Spontaneous polarization is temperature dependent, so a good perturbation probe is a change in temperature which induces a flow of charge to and from the surfaces. This is the pyroelectric effect. All polar crystals are pyroelectric, so the 10 polar crystal classes are sometimes referred to as the pyroelectric classes. Pyroelectric materials can be used as infrared and millimeter wavelength radiation detectors.

An electret is the electrical equivalent of a permanent magnet.

=== Mathematical description ===
The pyroelectric coefficient may be described as the change in the spontaneous polarization vector with temperature:
$$p_i = \frac{\partial P_{S,i}} {\partial T}$$
where p_{i} (Cm^{−2}K^{−1}) is the vector for the pyroelectric coefficient.

== History ==
The first record of the pyroelectric effect was made in 1707 by Johann Georg Schmidt, who noted that the "[hot] tourmaline could attract the ashes from the warm or burning coals, as the magnet does iron, but also repelling them again [after the contact]". In 1717 Louis Lemery noticed, as Schmidt had, that small scraps of non-conducting material were first attracted to tourmaline, but then repelled by it once they contacted the stone. In 1747 Linnaeus first related the phenomenon to electricity (he called tourmaline Lapidem Electricum, "the electric stone"), although this was not proven until 1756 by Franz Ulrich Theodor Aepinus.

Research into pyroelectricity became more sophisticated in the 19th century. In 1824 Sir David Brewster gave the effect the name it has today. Both William Thomson in 1878 and Woldemar Voigt in 1897 helped develop a theory for the processes behind pyroelectricity. Pierre Curie and his brother, Jacques Curie, studied pyroelectricity in the 1880s, leading to their discovery of some of the mechanisms behind piezoelectricity.

It is mistakenly attributed to Theophrastus (c. 314 BC) the first record of pyroelectricity. The misconception arose soon after the discovery of the pyroelectric properties of tourmaline, which made mineralogists of the time associate the legendary stone Lyngurium with it. Lyngurium is described in the work of Theophrastus as being similar to amber, without specifying any pyroelectric properties.

== Crystal classes ==
All crystal structures belong to one of thirty-two crystal classes based on the number of rotational axes and reflection planes they possess that leave the crystal structure unchanged (point groups). Of the thirty-two crystal classes, twenty-one are non-centrosymmetric (not having a centre of symmetry). Of these twenty-one, twenty exhibit direct piezoelectricity, the remaining one being the cubic class 432. Ten of these twenty piezoelectric classes are polar, i.e., they possess a spontaneous polarization, having a dipole in their unit cell, and exhibit pyroelectricity. If this dipole can be reversed by the application of an electric field, the material is said to be ferroelectric. Any dielectric material develops a dielectric polarization (electrostatics) when an electric field is applied, but a substance which has such a natural charge separation even in the absence of a field is called a polar material. Whether or not a material is polar is determined solely by its crystal structure. Only 10 of the 32 point groups are polar. All polar crystals are pyroelectric, so the ten polar crystal classes are sometimes referred to as the pyroelectric classes.

Piezoelectric crystal classes: 1, 2, m, 222, mm2, 4, -4, 422, 4mm, -42m, 3, 32, 3m, 6, -6, 622, 6mm, -62m, 23, -43m

Pyroelectric: 1, 2, m, mm2, 3, 3m, 4, 4mm, 6, 6mm

=== Related effects ===
Two effects which are closely related to pyroelectricity are ferroelectricity and piezoelectricity. Normally materials are very nearly electrically neutral on the macroscopic level. However, the positive and negative charges which make up the material are not necessarily distributed in a symmetric manner. If the sum of charge times distance for all elements of the basic cell does not equal zero the cell will have an electric dipole moment (a vector quantity). The dipole moment per unit volume is defined as the dielectric polarization. If this dipole moment changes with the effect of applied temperature changes, applied electric field, or applied pressure, the material is pyroelectric, ferroelectric, or piezoelectric, respectively.

The ferroelectric effect is exhibited by materials which possess an electric polarization in the absence of an externally applied electric field such that the polarization can be reversed if the electric field is reversed. Since all ferroelectric materials exhibit a spontaneous polarization, all ferroelectric materials are also pyroelectric (but not all pyroelectric materials are ferroelectric).

The piezoelectric effect is exhibited by crystals (such as quartz or ceramic) for which an electric voltage across the material appears when pressure is applied. Similar to pyroelectric effect, the phenomenon is due to the asymmetric structure of the crystals that allows ions to move more easily along one axis than the others. As pressure is applied, each side of the crystal takes on an opposite charge, resulting in a voltage drop across the crystal.

Pyroelectricity should not be confused with thermoelectricity: In a typical demonstration of pyroelectricity, the whole crystal is changed from one temperature to another, and the result is a temporary voltage across the crystal. In a typical demonstration of thermoelectricity, one part of the device is kept at one temperature and the other part at a different temperature, and the result is a permanent voltage across the device as long as there is a temperature difference. Both effects convert temperature change to electrical potential, but the pyroelectric effect converts temperature change over time into electrical potential, while the thermoelectric effect converts temperature change with position into electrical potential.

== Pyroelectric materials ==
Although artificial pyroelectric materials have been engineered, the effect was first discovered in minerals such as tourmaline. The pyroelectric effect is also present in bone and tendon.

The most important example is gallium nitride, a semiconductor. The large electric fields in this material are detrimental in light emitting diodes (LEDs), but useful for the production of power transistors.

Progress has been made in creating artificial pyroelectric materials, usually in the form of a thin film, using gallium nitride (GaN), caesium nitrate (CsNO_{3}), polyvinyl fluorides, derivatives of phenylpyridine, deuterated L-alanine doped triglycine sulphate, lithium niobate and cobalt phthalocyanine. Lithium tantalate (LiTaO_{3}) is a crystal exhibiting both piezoelectric and pyroelectric properties, which has been used to create small-scale nuclear fusion ("pyroelectric fusion"). Recently, pyroelectric and piezoelectric properties have been discovered in doped hafnium oxide (HfO_{2}), which is a standard material in CMOS manufacturing. Ferroelectric ceramics can also show pyroelectric properties.

== Applications ==
Pyroelectric materials, which generate electrical charges in response to temperature fluctuations, have diverse applications due to their ability to convert thermal energy into electricity or detect thermal changes. Key applications include:

=== Heat sensors ===
Very small changes in temperature can produce a pyroelectric potential. Passive infrared sensors are often designed around pyroelectric materials, as the heat of a human or animal from several feet away is enough to generate a voltage.

- Thermal sensors: Infrared detectors, fire alarms, gas sensors, and motion sensors utilize high voltage/current responsivity. Lead-based materials (e.g., PMN-PT) excel here due to superior figures of merit (FoMs).
- Environmental monitoring: Detecting temperature changes in chemical processes or respiratory systems (e.g., self-powered breathing sensors).

=== Energy harvesting and power generation ===
A pyroelectric can be repeatedly heated and cooled (analogously to a heat engine) to generate usable electrical power. An example of a heat engine is the movement of the pistons in an internal combustion engine like that found in a gasoline powered automobile.

One group calculated that a pyroelectric in an Ericsson cycle could reach 50% of Carnot efficiency, while a different study found a material that could, in theory, reach 84-92% of Carnot efficiency (these efficiency values are for the pyroelectric itself, ignoring losses from heating and cooling the substrate, other heat-transfer losses, and all other losses elsewhere in the system)

Possible advantages of pyroelectric generators for generating electricity (as compared to the conventional heat engine plus electrical generator) include:

- Harvesting energy from waste-heat:
  - Waste heat recovery: Harvesting low-grade thermal energy from industrial processes, automotive systems, and electrical appliances using lead-based ceramics (e.g., PZT, PMN-PT), lead-free ceramics (e.g., BNT-BT, KNN), and polymers (e.g., PVDF-TrFE). The Olsen cycle is a prominent thermodynamic method for efficient energy conversion.
- Less bulky equipment:
  - Flexible and wearable devices: Flexible polymers (e.g., PVDF) and composites power wearable/implantable electronics by leveraging body heat or ambient temperature changes. Examples include self-powered sensors and nanogenerators producing μW to mW/cm^{3} power densities.
- Fewer moving parts.

Although a few patents have been filed for such a device, such generators do not appear to be anywhere close to commercialization.

=== Nuclear fusion ===
Pyroelectric materials have been used to generate large electric fields necessary to steer deuterium ions in a nuclear fusion process. This is known as pyroelectric fusion.

=== Challenges and future directions ===
Despite their promising applications, pyroelectric materials face several challenges that must be addressed for broader adoption. One key limitation is the trade-off between pyroelectric coefficients, dielectric properties, and thermal stability, which affects overall performance and efficiency. Additionally, the efficiency of pyroelectric energy harvesting is highly dependent on rapid temperature fluctuations, making it challenging to achieve consistent power output in practical applications. Integration into flexible and biocompatible designs for wearable and miniaturized devices also remains a significant hurdle. Ongoing research aims to enhance figures of merit (FoMs), optimize phase transitions near morphotropic boundaries, and develop hybrid systems that combine pyroelectricity with other energy-harvesting mechanisms for multifunctional applications. Despite these challenges, the versatility of pyroelectric materials positions them as critical components for sustainable energy solutions and next-generation sensor technologies.

== See also ==
- Electrocaloric effect, an opposite effect of pyroelectricity
- Kelvin probe force microscope
- Lithium tantalate
- Thermoelectricity
- Zinc oxide
