= Dion-Jacobson phase =

Type of oxide mineral structure

Dion-Jacobson (DJ) phases are a type of perovskite structure represented by the general formula A^{I}A_{(n-1)}B_{(n)}X_{(3n+1)}. The structure of a DJ phase consists of two-dimensional ABX_{3} perovskite-like layers, where A^{I}, A, and B are cations, X is an anion (typically oxygen or a halide) and n represents the number of octahedral BX_{6} layers stacked in between the A^{I} cations.

The first recognized Dion-Jacobson phases were reported by M. Dion in September 1981, in which Dion prepared and characterized a series of n = 3 A^{I}Ca_{2}Nb_{3}O_{10} (A^{I} = Li, Na, K, Rb, Cs, NH_{4}, Tl) compounds.

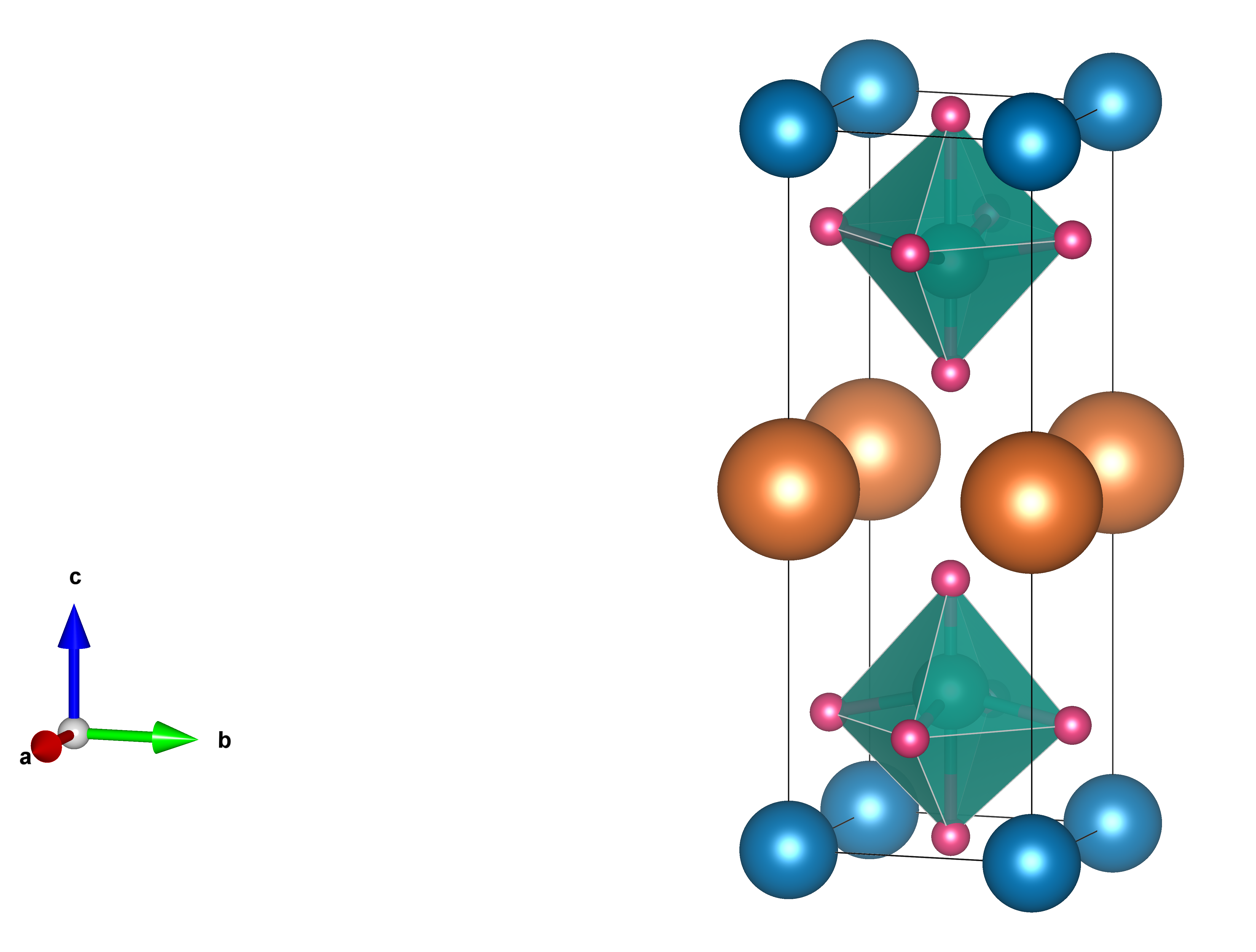
Crystal structure of n=2 Dion-Jacobson phase CsLaNb_{2}O_{7}. Cs shown in orange, La in blue, Nb in teal, O in magenta.

== Crystal structure ==
The general formula for the Dion-Jacobson phase can be written as A^{I}A_{(n-1)}B_{(n)}X_{(3n+1)}, where A^{I}, A, and B are cations, and X is an anion. The structure consists of perovskite-like two-dimensional layers, constructed by stacking n corner-shared BX_{6} octahedra with the A cation in 12-fold cuboctahedral coordination with the anions. The perovskite-like layers are separated by the A^{I} cation, which is typically 8-coordinate. The A^{I} cation may consist of a single cation or Depending on the identity of the A^{I} cation, the perovskite-like layers can be displaced by 1/2 of the unit cell parameter, which changes the coordination environment of the M cation to 4-coordinate.

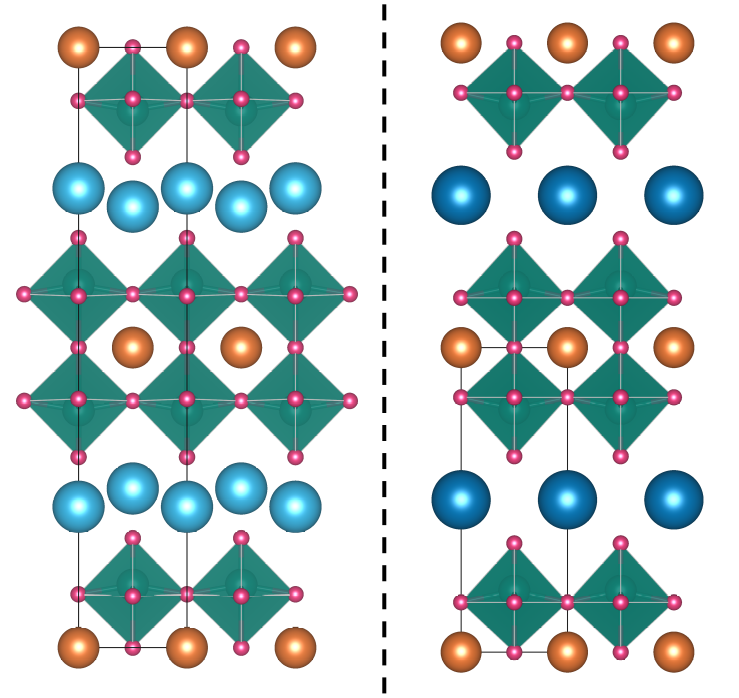
Comparison of crystal structures of KLaNb_{2}O_{7} (left) and CsLaNb_{2}O_{7} (right). The perovskite-like layers in KLaNb_{2}O_{7} are displaced by 1/2 of the unit cell and K has 50% occupancy in each site.

== Synthesis ==
Inorganic Dion-Jacobson perovskites, such as KLaNb_{2}O_{7}, have been synthesized via high temperature solid state reactions between the respective carbonate and oxide precursors. Two-dimensional Dion-Jacobson halide perovskites, such as (3AMPY)(MA)Pb_{2}I_{7} (3AMPY = 3-(aminomethyl)pyridinium and MA= methylammonium) have been synthesized via precipitation reactions as well.

== Applications ==
Dion-Jacobson oxides have applications as ferroelectrics, piezoelectrics, and photocatalysts. The layering between differently-charged M cations reduces the symmetry of the BO_{6} octahedra, which breaks inversion symmetry and allows for or enhances these properties. Both n = 2 and n = 3 Dion-Jacobson phases can be used for these applications. Hybrid organic-inorganic Dion-Jacobson phases have additional uses as photovoltaics and photodetectors, having better stability than three-dimensional hybrid perovskites.

The stability of hybrid organic-inorganic Dion-Jacobson phases with photovoltaic properties facilitates their use in perovskite solar cells. Hybrid organic-inorganic Dion-Jacobson phases may have a divalent organic cation which can bridge adjacent ABX_{3} layers or two organic cations with which are orientationally stabilized by a Van der Waals interaction between neutral moeities on each cation.. The improved structure allows for more efficient interlayer charge transport and environmental stability. Dion-Jacobson phases can be used as the absorbing layer in two-dimensional solar cells or as a layer for passivation on top of 3D perovskites to improve stability and power conversion efficiency. For example, an efficiency of 24.9% was achieved with a two-dimensional Dion-Jacobson solar cell, which retained 97% of its initial power conversion efficiency after 1000 hours in ambient air. When used as a top layer in a three-dimensional solar cell, a power conversion efficiency of 19.5% was achieved with 83% of the original efficiency retained after 1260 hours under continuous illumination.

Through additive manufacturing, the performance of Dion-Jacobson phases can be improved even further. Incorporating chloride salts or thiocyanate salts into the precursor solution can coordinate ions from those compounds with undercoordinated ions often used in perovskite photovoltaics, such as Pb^{2+} and Sn^{2+}, to reduce trap states and improve the power conversion efficiency of Dion-Jacobson solar cells. Other additives, such as dimethyl sulfoxide, can slow down crystallization to create larger grains and improve the structural properties of Dion-Jacobson phases.

== See also ==
- Aurivillius phase
- Ruddlesden-Popper phase
