= Perovskite nanocrystal =

Class of semiconductor nanocrystals

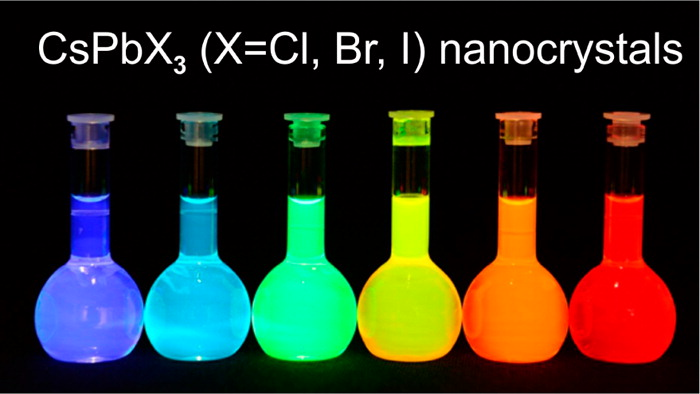
Figure 1. Perovskite nanocrystals can emit brightly when excited by ultraviolet or blue light. Their colors are tunable across the entire visible spectrum by changing the halide from chloride (UV/blue) to bromide (green) and iodide (red)

Perovskite nanocrystals are a class of semiconductor nanocrystals that are related to traditional quantum dots. Perovskite nanocrystals have an ABX_{3} composition where A = cesium, methylammonium (MA), or formamidinium (FA); B = lead or tin; and X = chloride, bromide, or iodide.

Owing to their unusual band-structure, these materials are defect tolerant or able to emit brightly without surface passivation. In contrast other quantum dots such as CdSe must be passivated with an epitaxially matched shell to be bright emitters. In addition to this, lead-halide perovskite nanocrystals remain bright emitters when the size of the nanocrystal imposes only weak quantum confinement. This enables the production of nanocrystals that exhibit narrow emission linewidths regardless of their dispersity.

The combination of these attributes and their easy-to-perform synthesis has resulted in numerous articles demonstrating the use of perovskite nanocrystals as both classical and quantum light sources with considerable commercial interest. Perovskite nanocrystals have been applied to numerous other optoelectronic applications such as light emitting diodes, lasers, visible communication, scintillators, solar cells, and photodetectors.

== Physical properties ==
Perovskite nanocrystals possess numerous unique attributes: defect tolerance, high quantum yield, fast rates of radiative decay and narrow emission line width in weak confinement, which make them ideal candidates for a variety of optoelectronic applications.

=== Bulk vs. nano ===
The intriguing optoelectronic properties of lead halide perovskites were first studied in single crystals and thin films.: From these reports, it was discovered that these materials possess high carrier mobility, long carrier lifetimes, long carrier diffusion lengths, and small effective carrier masses. Unlike their nanocrystal counterparts, bulk ABX_{3} materials are non-luminescent at room temperature, but they do exhibit bright photoluminescence once cooled to cryogenic temperatures.

=== Defect-tolerance ===
Contrary to the characteristics of other colloidal quantum dots such as CdSe, ABX_{3} QDs are shown to be bright, high quantum yield (above 80%) and stable emitters with narrow linewidths without surface passivation.In II-VI systems, the presence of dangling bonds on the surface results in photoluminescence quenching and photoluminescent intermittence or blinking. The lack of sensitivity to the surface can be rationalized from the electronic band structure and density of states calculations for these materials. Unlike conventional II-VI semiconductors where the band gap is formed by bonding and antibonding orbitals, the frontier orbitals in ABX_{3} QDs are formed by antibonding orbitals composed of Pb 6s 6p and X np orbitals (n is the principle quantum number for the corresponding halogen atom). As a result, dangling bonds (under-coordinated atoms) result in intraband states or shallow traps instead of deep mid-gap states (e.g. d in CdSe QDs. This observation was corroborated by computational studies which demonstrated that the electronic structure of CsPbX_{3} materials exhibits a trap-free band gap. Furthermore, band structure calculations performed by various groups have demonstrated that these are direct band gap materials at their R-point (a critical point of the Brillouin zone) with a composition dependent band gaps.

=== Photoluminescence ===
It was discovered in 2015 that the photoluminescence of perovskite nanocrystals can be post-synthetically tuned across the visible spectral range through halide substitution to obtain APbCl_{3}, APb(Cl,Br)_{3}, APbBr_{3}, APb(Br,I)_{3}, and APbI_{3}; there was no evidence of APb(Cl,I)_{3}. The change in band-gap with composition can be described by Vegard's Law, which describes the change in lattice parameter as a function of the change in composition for a solid solution. However, the change in lattice parameter can be rewritten to describe the change in band gap for many semiconductors. The change in band gap directly affects the energy or wavelength of light that can be absorbed by the material and therefore its color. Furthermore, this directly alters the energy of emitted light according to the Stokes shift of the material. This quick, post-synthetic anion-tunability is in contrast to other quantum dot systems where emission wavelength is primarily tuned through particle size by altering the degree of quantum confinement.

Aside from tuning the absorption edge and emission wavelength by anion substitution, it was also observed that the A-site cation also affects both properties. This occurs as a result of the distortion of the perovskite structure and the tilting of octahedra due to the size of the A-cation. Cs, which yields a Goldschmidt tolerance factor of less than one, results in a distorted, orthorhombic structure at room temperature. This results in reduced orbital overlap between the halide and lead atoms and blue shifts the absorption and emission spectra. On the other hand, FA yields a cubic structure and results in FAPbX_{3} having red shifted absorption and emission spectra as compared to both Cs and MA. Of these three cations, MA is intermediate size between Cs and FA and therefore results in absorption and emission spectra intermediate between those of Cs and FA. Through the combination of both anionic and cationic tuning, the whole spectrum ranging from near-UV to near-IR can be covered.

==== Absorption Coefficient ====
Recent studies have demonstrated that CsPbBr_{3} nanocrystals have an absorption coefficient of 2×10^{5} cm^{−1} at 335 nm and 8×10^{4} cm^{−1} at 400 nm.

=== Single Dot Spectroscopy of Perovskite Nanocrystals ===
==== Blinking and Spectral diffusion ====
Spectroscopic studies of individual nanocrystals have revealed blinking-free emission and very low spectral diffusion without a passivating shell around the NCs. Studies have also demonstrated blinking-free emission at room temperature with a strongly reduced Auger recombination rate at room temperature (CsPbI_{3} NCs).

==== Exciton fine-structure and the Rashba effect ====
It was observed that emission from perovskite nanocrystals may be the result of a bright (optically active) triplet state. Several effects have been suggested to play a role on the exciton fine structure such as electron-hole exchange interactions, crystal field and shape anisotropy, as well as the Rashba effect. Recent reports have described the presence of the Rashba effect within bulk- and nano- CsPbBr_{3} and CsPb(Br,Cl)_{3}. While it has been reported that the Rashba effect contributes to the existence of a lowest energy triplet state CsPb(Br,Cl)_{3}, recent work on FAPbBr_{3} has indicated the presence of a lower lying dark state, which can be activated with the application of a magnetic field.

==== Coherent emission ====
Numerous quantum optical technologies require coherent light sources. Perovskite nanocrystals have been demonstrated as sources of such light as well as suitable materials for the generation of single photons with high coherence.

=== Self-assembly and Superfluorescence ===
Monodisperse perovskite nanocrystals can be assembled into cubic superlattices, which can range from a few hundreds of nanometers to tens of microns in size and show tunable photoluminescence by changing nanocrystal composition via anion exchange (for example, from green-emitting CsPbBr_{3} nanocrystal superlattices to yellow and orange emitting CsPb(I_{1−x}Br_{x})_{3} nanocrystal superlattices to red-emitting CsPbI_{3} ones). These superlattices have been reported to exhibit very high degree of structural order and unusual optical phenomena such as superfluorescence. In the case of these superlattices, it was reported that the dipoles of the individual nanocrystals can become aligned and then simultaneously emit several pulses of light.

== Chemical properties ==
=== Synthesis ===
Early attempts were made to prepare MAPbX_{3} perovskites as nanocrystals in 2014 by non-template synthesis. It was not until 2015 that CsPbX_{3} nanocrystals were prepared by the Kovalenko research group at ETH Zurich. by a hot-injection synthesis. Since then numerous other synthetic routes towards the successful preparation of ABX_{3} NCs have been demonstrated.

==== Hot-injection ====
The majority of papers reporting on ABX_{3} NCs make use of a hot injection procedure in which one of the reagents is swiftly injected into a hot solution containing the other reagents and ligands. The combination of high temperature and rapid addition of the reagent result in a rapid reaction that results in supersaturation and nucleation occurring over a very short period of time with a large number of nuclei. After a short period of time, the reaction is quenched by quickly cooling to room temperature. Since 2015, several articles detailing improvements to this approach with zwitterionic ligands, branched ligands and post-synthetic treatments have been reported. Recently, soy-lecithin was demonstrated to be a ligand system for these nanocrystals that could stabilize concentrations from several ng/mL up to 400 mg/mL.

==== Co-precipitation ====
A second, popular method for the preparation of ABX_{3} NCs relies on the ionic nature of APbX_{3} materials. Briefly, a polar, aprotic solvent such as DMF or DMSO is used to dissolve the starting reagents such as PbBr_{2}, CsBr, oleic acid, and an amine. The subsequent addition of this solution into a non-polar solvent reduces the polarity of the solution and causes precipitation of the ABX_{3} phase.

==== Microfluidics ====
Microfluidics have been also used to synthesize CsPbX_{3} NCs and to screen and study synthetic parameters. Recently, a modular microfluidic platform has been developed at North Carolina State University to further optimize the synthesis and composition of these materials.

==== Other routes ====
Outside of the traditional synthetic routes, several papers have reported that CsPbX_{3} NCs could be prepared on supports or within porous structures even without ligands. Dirin et al. first demonstrated that bright NCs of CsPbX_{3} could be prepared without organic ligands within the pores of mesoporous silica. By using mesoporous silica as a template, the size of CsPbX_{3} nanodomains is restricted to the pore size. This allows for greater control over emission wavelength via quantum confinement and illustrates the defect tolerant nature of these materials. This concept was later extended to the preparation of ligand-free APbX_{3} NCs on alkali-halide supports that could be shelled with NaBr without deteriorating their optical properties and protecting the nanocrystals against a number of polar solvents.

As a result of the low melting point and ionic nature of ABX_{3} materials, several studies have demonstrated that bright ABX_{3} nanocrystals can also be prepared by ball-milling.

With NCs, the composition can be tuned via ion exchange i.e. the ability to post-synthetically exchange the ions in the lattice for those added. This has been shown to be possible for both anions and cations.

==== Anion exchange ====
The anions in the lead halide perovskites are highly mobile. The mobility arises from the diffusion of halide vacancies throughout the lattice, with an activation barrier of 0.29 eV and 0.25 eV for CsPbCl_{3} and CsPbBr_{3} respectively. (see: physical properties). This was used by Nedelcu et al. and Akkerman et al., to demonstrate that the composition of cesium lead halide perovskite nanocrystals could be tuned continuously from CsPbCl_{3} to CsPbBr_{3} and from CsPbBr_{3} to CsPbI_{3} to obtain emission across the entire visible spectrum. While this was first observed in a colloidal suspension, this was also shown in solid pellets of alkali halide salts pressed with previously synthesized nanocrystals. This same phenomenon has also been observed for MAPbX_{3} and FAPbX_{3} NCs. The anion exchange reaction has been investigated at the single nanocrystal level. In quantum-confined nanocrystals, the anion exchange leads to a uniform bandgap energy across the nanocrystal due to the quantum confinement effect. However, in nanocrystals larger than the Bohr diameter, multiple emission sites form, resulting in iodide- or bromide-rich regions.

==== Cation exchange and doping ====
Although several reports showed that CsPbX_{3} NCs could be doped with Mn^{2+}, they accomplished this through the addition of the Mn precursor during the synthesis, and not through cation exchange. Cation exchange can be used to partially exchange Pb^{2+} with Sn^{2+}, Zn^{2+}, or Cd^{2+} over the course of several hours. In addition to these cations, gold was also shown to be a suitable candidate for cation exchange yielding a mixed-valent, and distorted, perovskite with the composition Cs_{2}Au(I)Au(III)Br_{6}. A-site cation exchange has also been shown to be a viable route for the transformation of CsPbBr_{3} to MAPbBr_{3} and from CsPbI_{3} to FAPbI_{3}.

==== Ligand-assisted reprecipitation (LARP) ====
Ligand-assisted reprecipitation method is dedicated for the preparation of perovskite nanoplatelets (NPls). In this method, the precursors in different solvents whether polar like Dimethylformamide and Dimethyl sulfoxide or non-polar like toluene and hexane are added in the presence of the ligands to form the perovskite NPls through supersaturation. The NPls thickness obtained from this method depends on the concentration of the ligands as well as the chain length of the organic ligands. Therefore, the thickness can be controlled by ratio between A-cation-oleate and lead-halide precursors in the reaction medium. By adjusting the toluene and acetone during the synthesis, the NPls are crystallized and precipitated at room temperature with these two solvents, respectively.

=== Morphology ===
Nanomaterials can be prepared with various morphologies that range from spherical particles/quantum wells (0D) to wires (1D) and platelets or sheets (2D), and this has been previously demonstrated for QDs such as CdSe. While the initial report of lead halide perovskite NCs covered cubic particles, subsequent reports demonstrated that these materials could also be prepared as both platelets (2D) and wires (1D). Due to the varying degrees of quantum confinement present in these different shapes, the optical properties (emission spectrum and mean lifetime) change. As an example of the effect of morphology, cubic nanocrystals of CsPbBr_{3} can emit from 470 nm to 520 nm based on their size (470 nm emission requires nanocrystals with an average diameter of less than 4 nm). Within this same composition (CsPbBr_{3}), nanoplatelets exhibit emission that is blue shifted from that of cubes with the wavelength depending on the number of monolayers contained within the platelet (from 440 nm for three monolayers to 460 nm for 5 monolayers). Nanowires of CsPbBr_{3}, on the other hand, emit from 473 nm to 524 nm depending on the width of the wire prepared with lifetimes also in the range of 2.5 ns – 20.6 ns.

Similarly to CsPbBr_{3}, MAPbBr_{3} NCs also exhibit morphologically dependent optical properties with nanocrystals of MAPbBr_{3} emitting from 475 nm to 520 nm and exhibiting average lifetimes on the order of 240 ns depending on their composition. Nanoplatelets and nanowires have been reported to emit at 465 nm and 532 nm, respectively.

== Structure and composition ==
Perovskite nanocrystal all have the general composition ABX_{3} in which A is a large, central cation (typically MA, FA, or Cs) that sits in a cavity surrounded by corner-sharing BX_{6} octahedra (B = Pb, Sn; X = Cl, Br, I). Depending on the composition, the crystal structure can vary from orthorhombic to cubic, and the stability of a given composition can be qualitatively predicted by its goldschmidt tolerance factor

$t={(r_a+r_x) \over \sqrt{2} (r_b+r_x)}$

where t is the calculated tolerance factor and r is the ionic radius of the A, B, and X ions, respectively. Structures with tolerance factors between 0.8 and 1 are expected to have cubic symmetry and form three dimensional perovskite structures such as those observed in CaTiO_{3}. Furthermore, tolerance factors of t > 1 yield hexagonal structures (CsNiBr_{3} type), and t < 0.8 result in NH_{4}CdCl_{3} type structures. If the A-site cation is too large (t >1), but packs efficiently, 2D perovskites can be formed.

=== Distortions and Phase transitions ===
The corner-sharing BX_{6} octahedra form a three-dimensional framework through bridging halides. The angle (Φ) formed by B-X-B (metal-halide-metal) can be used to judge the closeness of a given structure to that of an ideal perovskite. Although these octahedra are interconnected and form a framework, the individual octahedra are able to tilt with respect to one another. This tilting is affected by the size of the "A" cation as well as external stimuli such as temperature or pressure.

If the B-X-B angle deviates too far from 180°, phase transitions towards non-luminescent or all-together non-perovskite phases can occur. If the B-X-B angle does not deviate very far from 180°, the overall structure of the perovskite remains as a 3D network of interconnected octahedra, but the optical properties may change. This distortion increases the band gap of the material as the overlap between Pb and X based orbitals is reduced. For example, changing the A cation from Cs to MA or FA alters the tolerance factor and decreases the band gap as the B-X-B bond angle approaches 180° and the orbital overlap between the lead and halide atoms increases. These distortions can further manifest themselves as deviations in the band gap from that expected by Vegard's Law for solid solutions.

=== Crystal structure and twinning in nanocrystals ===
The room temperature crystal structures of the various bulk lead-halide perovskites have been extensively studied and have been reported for the APbX_{3} perovskites. The average crystal structures of the nanocrystals tend to agree with those of the bulk. Studies have, however, shown that these structures are dynamic and deviate from the predicted structures due to the presence of twinned nanodomains.

== Surface chemistry ==
In general, the perovskite nanocrystal surface is considered to be both ionic and highly dynamic.

=== Ligands and the nanocrystal surface ===
Figure 2. Ligand binding and the dynamic surface stabilization of lead-halide perovskite nanocrystals. (A) Examples of ligands that bind at A-site and X-site vacancies on the perovskite surface. (B) Dynamic stabilization of a CsPbBr_{3} nanocrystal by surface ligands. This figure shows how surface vacancies provide ligand-binding sites and how reversible ligand-binding contributes to nanocrystal surface stability.

The surface of a perovskite nanocrystal is covered by ligands that help stabilize the crystal and control its interactions with surroundings. Oleic acid and oleylamine are commonly used ligands in the preparation of lead-halide perovskite nanocrystals. Their charged forms, oleate and oleylammonium, can participating in surface binding. Commonly used surface ligands can exchange between bound and free states and detach during isolation and purification. Binding strength varies with ligand chemistry. For example, phosphonic acid-derived ligands on CsPbBr_{3} nanocrystals have shown stronger binding than oleylammonium bromide or cesium oleate pairs.

=== Surface defects ===
Lead halide perovskites are described as defect tolerant because many defects produce electronic states near the band edges rather than deep within the bandgap, which then limits their ability to trap charge carriers. Defect tolerance contributes to the bright photoluminescence of lead-halide perovskite nanocrystals.

Ligand detachment, however, can expose surface defects and link the optical properties of the nanocrystal to the condition of their ligand shell. Extensive loss of surface ion pairs, however, can generate trap states and reduce photoluminescence quantum yield. Halide vacancies, for example, can leave undercoordinated lead atoms that trap charge carriers and promote nonradiative recombination, which allows electrons and holes to recombine without emitting light.

=== Surface passivation ===
Surface passivation involves treating nanocrystal surfaces with ions or ligands to reduce the activity of charge-trapping sites. In lead-halide perovskite nanocrystals, for example, suitable ligands can bind to undercoordinated lead atoms due to halide vacancies. Thiocyanate salts have been used to treat these sites, and they help to reduce nonradiative recombination and improving PLQY.Binding suitable ligands to these atoms can passivate the traps and bound ligands can help maintain colloidal stability during processing.

== Stability & degradation ==
=== Environmental degradation ===
Perovskite nanocrystals can degrade when exposed to moisture, oxygen, heat, or light. The extent of degradation depends on their composition and the conditions in which they are stored or used. These exposures can affect both crystal structure and optical performance. Moisture can alter the crystal structure and cause decomposition or dissolution. Heat and prolonged illumination can also promote structural changes and reduce photoluminescence. These factors can occur together, so stability measured under a single controlled condition may not reflect performance during use.

=== Ligand loss and colloidal stability ===
Commonly used surface ligands bind dynamically. Because they can detach during separation and purification, the loss of surface ligands can reduce the stability of perovskite nanocrystals. This detachment can cause aggregation and precipitation while exposing surface defects. Polar solvents also promote ligand loss. Extensive loss of surface ion pairs can generate trap states and reduce photoluminescence quantum yields (PLQYs).

=== Ion migration & phase stability ===
Figure 3. Approaches to improving perovskite nanocrystal stability. Surface treatments modify or replace ligands and passivate exposed sites, while encapsulation in polymers, inorganic materials, or lipid micelles provides a protective barrier around the nanocrystals.

Halide ions are mobile and their movement can alter the halide composition of perovskite nanocrystals through ion exchange. Some compositions can also undergo structural phase transitions. CsPb_{3} nanocrystals for example can transform from a perovskite phase into a non-perovskite phase with heat, light or moisture exposure. Surface ligand chemistry also influences this phase stability.

=== Improving stability ===
Researchers use stronger binding ligands and protective coatings to improve nanocrystal stability. Ligand treatments act directly on the surface by strengthening binding or restoring missing surface halides. Phosphonic acid derived ligands, for example, show stronger binding than oleylammonium bromide or cesium oleate pairs. Encapsulation adds a barrier between the nanocrystals and water or other environmental stressors. Nanocrystals can be embedded in polymers or enclosed within inorganic materials such as silica, although the protection that is achieved depends on the coating and processing method. These strategies must also suit the intended application, since an insulating protective layer can improve environmental stability but also make electrical charge transport more difficult.

== Lead-free perovskite nanocrystals ==
Many high performing perovskite nanocrystals contain lead, which raises concerns about potential exposure if these materials degrade or enter the environment. Producing materials consistently at larger scales presents another challenge, since synthesis conditions affect particle uniformity and the resulting properties. These limitations have motivated research into lead free alternatives.

=== Lead-free perovskite nanocrystals ===
Figure 4. Challenges, stabilization strategies, and applications of tin-based halide perovskite nanocrystals. The figure summarizes sources of intrinsic instability in tin-based nanocrystals, including Sn^{2+} oxidation and lattice defects, along with approaches used to improve stability and potential applications.

Replacing lead requires choosing a less toxic element that must also be able to support a suitable crystal structure and demonstrate useful optical properties. Tin(II) can replace lead(II), but ions with different charges need changes to the composition to maintain the charge balance. These approaches have produced several families of lead free nanocrystals, although their properties differ substantially. Tin is one of the most direct substitutes for lead because the tin(II) ion can form similar perovskite structures. Its tendency to oxidize to tin(IV), however, makes tin-based nanocrystals difficult to keep stable. Cesium tin halide nanocrystals (CsSnX_{3}) have been synthesized with optical properties that can be adjusted through halide composition and crystal size, extending from the visible into the near-infrared region. Research has therefore focused on controlling synthesis conditions and passivating the surface to preserve tin in its divalent state. Several lead-free perovskites have been prepared colloidally: Cs_{3}Bi_{2}I_{9}, Cs_{2}PdX_{6}, CsSnX_{3}. CsSnX_{3} NCs, although the closest lead-free analogue to the highly luminescent CsPbX_{3} NCs, do not exhibit high quantum yields (<1% PLQY)

Lead-free halide double perovskites replace pairs of lead(II) ions with combinations of monovalent and trivalent metal ions, commonly giving the formula A_{2}B(I)B(III)X_{6}. One example of a lead-free halide double perovskite is Cs_{2}AgBiX_{6}, which contains silver(I) and bismuth(III). These materials avoid lead, but they can degrade as well. Studies of Cs_{2}AgBiX_{6} found that silver migration and coalescence contributed to decomposition in solution. Changes in composition and doping can improve the emission and other optical properties of lead-free nanocrystals. Alloying changes the host composition while doping introduces small amounts of additional ions that can alter electronic states or provide new pathways for light emission. Surface treatments remain important because defects can limit performance even when the bulk composition is suitable.

== Other phases ==
Ternary cesium lead halides have multiple stable phases that can be formed; these include CsPbX_{3} (perovskite), Cs_{4}PbX_{6} (so called "zero-dimensional" phase due to disconnected [PbX_{6}]^{4-} octahedra), and CsPb_{2}X_{5}. All three phases have been prepared colloidally either by a direct synthesis or via nanocrystal transformations.

A rising research interest in these compounds created a disagreement within the community around the zero-dimensional Cs_{4}PbBr_{6} phase. Two contradicting claims exist regarding the optical properties of this material: i) the phase exhibits high photoluminescent quantum yield emission at 510-530 nm and ii) the phase is non-luminescent in the visible spectrum. It was later demonstrated that pure, Cs_{4}PbBr_{6} NCs were non-luminescent, and that these could be converted to luminescent CsPbX_{3} NCs and vice versa.

A similar debate had occurred regarding the CsPb_{2}Br_{5} phase, which was also reported as being strongly luminescent. This phase, like the Cs_{4}PbBr_{6} phase, is a wide gap semiconductor (~3.1 eV), but it is also an indirect-semiconductor and is non-luminescent. The non-luminescent nature of this phase was further demonstrated in NH_{4}Pb_{2}Br_{5}.

== Potential applications ==
=== Light-emitting Diodes ===
Perovskite NCs are promising materials for the emitting layer of light-emitting diodes (LEDs) as they offer potential advantages over organic LEDs (OLEDs) such as the elimination of precious metals (Ir, Pt) and simpler syntheses. The first report of green electroluminescence (EL) was from MAPbBr_{3} NCs although no efficiency values were reported. It was later observed that MAPbBr_{3} NCs could form in a polymer matrix when the precursors for MAPbBr_{3} thin films were mixed with an aromatic polyidmide precursor. The authors of this study obtained green EL with an external quantum efficiency (EQE) of up to 1.2%.

LEDs based on colloidal CsPbX_{3} NCs exhibit blue, green and orange EL with sub-1% EQE. Since then, efficiencies have reached above 8% for green LEDs (CsPbBr_{3} NCs), above 7% for red LEDs (CsPbI_{3} NCs), and above 1% for blue LEDs (CsPb(Br/Cl)_{3}).

=== Lasers ===
Perovskite MAPbX_{3} thin films are promising materials for optical gain applications such as lasers and optical amplifiers. Afterwards, the lasing properties of colloidal perovskite NCs such as CsPbX_{3} nanocubes, MAPbBr_{3} nanoplatelets and FAPbX_{3} nanocubes were also demonstrated. Thresholds as low as 2 uJ cm^{−2} have been reported for colloidal NCs (CsPbX_{3}) and 220 nJ cm^{−2} for MAPbI_{3} nanowires. Interestingly, perovskite NCs show efficient optical gain properties not only under resonant excitation, but also under two-photon excitation where the excitation light falls into the transparent range of the active material. While the nature of optical gain in perovskites is not yet clearly understood, the dominant hypothesis is that the population inversion of excited states required for gain appears to be due to bi-excitonic states in the perovskite.

=== Photocatalysis ===
Perovskite nanocrystals have also been investigated as potential photocatalysts.

=== Security ===
Perovskite nanocrystals doped with large cations such as ethylene diammonium (en) exhibit hypsochromaticity as well as lengthened photoluminescence lifetimes relative to their undoped counterparts. This phenomenon was exploited to generate single color luminescent QR codes that could only be deciphered by measuring the photoluminescence lifetime.

== See also ==
- Quantum Dots
- Perovskites
- Perovskite (structure)
- Light-emitting diode (LED)
- Methylammonium lead halide
- nanomaterials
- Semiconductors
- Optoelectronics
