= Megalibrary (nanotech) =

In nanotechnology, a megalibrary is an assembly of millions of nanostructures. Its contents vary by size, composition, and shape. A single megalibrary may contain more new inorganic materials than have been synthesized and characterized to date.

== Design ==
Megalibraries are typically stored on 2 cm x 2 cm chips, each holding millions of structures. They have been described as analogous to gene chips. The chips are prepared by using a cantilever-free lithography method to deposit the nanoreactors on the substrate. Parallel polymer pen lithography (PPL) can be combined with an ink spray-coating method to create pen arrays, where each pen has a different, but deliberately chosen quantity and composition of ink.

To synthesize metallic nanoparticles, this ink would consist of a block copolymer named poly(ethylene oxide)-b-poly(2-vinylpyridine) (PEO-b-P2VP), which has metal ions dissolved inside which eventually form the nanoparticles. Each pen deposits a small dot of ink onto the substrate, so that millions of dots in total are deposited on the substrate. Afterwards, the substrate with the deposited inks is slowly heated while being exposed to hydrogen and argon gas, in a process called thermal annealing. This allows the PEO-b-P2VP to decompose away while the dissolved metal ions in each dot of ink stick together and form a nanoparticle. This method of using polymer pen lithography with PEO-b-P2VP inks is also known as scanning probe block copolymer lithography (SPBCL), and can be used to create megalibraries of metallic nanoparticles with varying compositions and sizes.

Through SPBCL, nanoparticles consisting of as many as 7 different elements can be synthesized. In nanoparticles with multiple elements, there may be separate regions containing different crystal structures and compositions, the boundary between which is called an interface. Nanoparticles with as many as 6 interfaces have been synthesized with SPBCL.

== Applications ==
Megalibraries have identified catalysts for use in the clean energy, automotive and chemical industries, and researchers are exploring new ways to expand their applications. When the nanoparticles in a megalibrary are first synthesized, their properties, such as crystal structure and chemical composition, may be unknown. Oftentimes, it is necessary to determine these properties to determine which nanoparticles would also be suitable for a particular application. Methods to do this would need to be very efficient, because a megalibrary can contain millions of nanoparticles to be analyzed.

One family of methods that are being researched consist of using electron microscopy to analyze the nanoparticles. Artificial intelligence techniques can be used in combination to do this. For example, neural networks can be used to automatically locate nanoparticles of interest under a microscope. After locating the nanoparticles, methods like EDS can be used to determine their composition.

Electron diffraction patterns of the nanoparticles can also be acquired to determine their crystal symmetries. For example, researchers have developed neural networks that use diffraction patterns to predict the crystal systems of nanoparticles.

To determine catalytic performance of the nanoparticles, it is also sometimes possible to directly use the nanoparticles to catalyze a reaction, and then measure the change in the amount of products or reactants afterwards to determine the catalytic effectiveness of different nanoparticles in the megalibrary. For example, nanoparticles’ abilities to catalyze growth of single-walled carbon nanotubes in a nanoparticle megalibrary can be determined by Raman spectroscopy. Researchers have also identified nanoparticle catalysts for the degradation of rhodamine B, a dye that has been linked to cancer, by using fluorescence confocal microscopy to visualize the extent of degradation for different nanoparticles.

Aside from catalysis, megalibraries have also been used to discover materials with desired optical properties. For example, researchers have demonstrated the use of photoluminescence spectroscopy to identify blue photoemitters in a megalibrary of perovskite nanocrystals.
