= Bengt Aurivillius =

Swedish chemist (1918–1994)

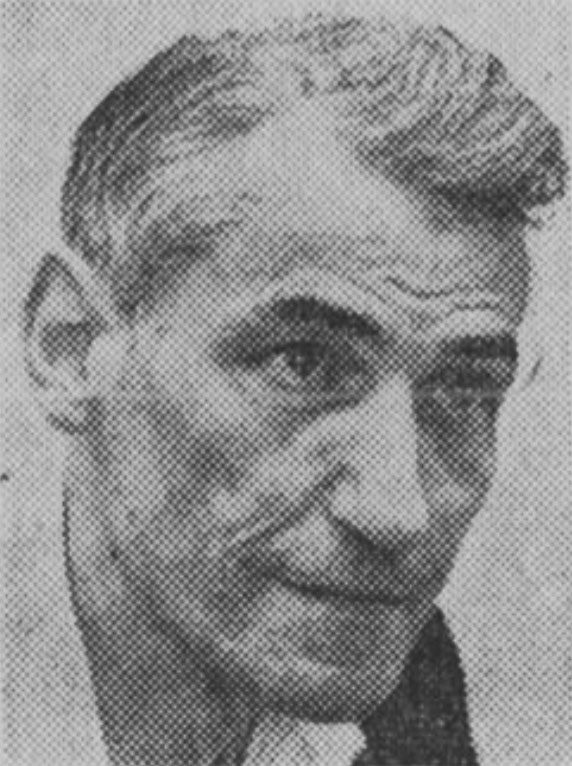
- Bengt Aurivillius (1965)
- Born: 4 December 1918; Linköping, Sweden
- Died: 2 May 1994 (aged 75); Malmöhus, Sweden
- Education: Stockholm University
- Occupation: Chemist
- Known for: Aurivillius phases
- Spouse: Karin Aurivillius
- Scientific career
- Institutions: Swedish National Defence Research Institute; Stockholm University; Lund University

Bengt Aurivillius (4 December 1918 in Linköping – 2 May 1994 in St. Peter's Parish, Malmöhus County) was a Swedish chemist known for his research in metal and mixed oxides.

== Education and career ==
Aurivillius received his basic scientific education at the then Stockholm University where he graduated in 1937 and earned a fil. lic. in 1943. By 1949, he had made some important discoveries about the oxidation of mixed metals, which became quite prominent in the world of chemistry. He completed his dissertation, "X-ray Examinations of Bismuth Oxifluoride and Mixed Oxides with Trivalent Bismuth", at Stockholm University in 1951. Aurivillius joined the Swedish National Defence Research Institute in 1952, where he worked first as a research engineer and later senior researcher. By 1960, Aurivillius was a docent of physical chemistry and acting senior lecturer at the Stockholm University. In 1965, he was appointed professor of inorganic chemistry at Lund University, a professorship he held until 1983. During the sixties, he worked in the field of crystallography alongside his wife, Karin Aurivillius.

== Scientific research ==
Aurivillius is known for his study on bismuth compounds, including bismuth sesquioxide (Bi_{2}O_{3}) and bismuth layer structured ferroelectrics based on the oxide perovskite structure, which was later named after him as the Aurivillius phases. He characterized the ferroelectric properties of these materials, which have become a family of materials for lead-free ceramics.

== Personal life ==
Bengt Aurivillius is a member of the Aurivillius family, his father was the entomologist Christopher Aurivillius. His wife was crystallographer Karin Aurivillius.

== See also ==
- Aurivillius phases
