= Arctite =

Colourless mineral found in the Kola Peninsula northern Russia

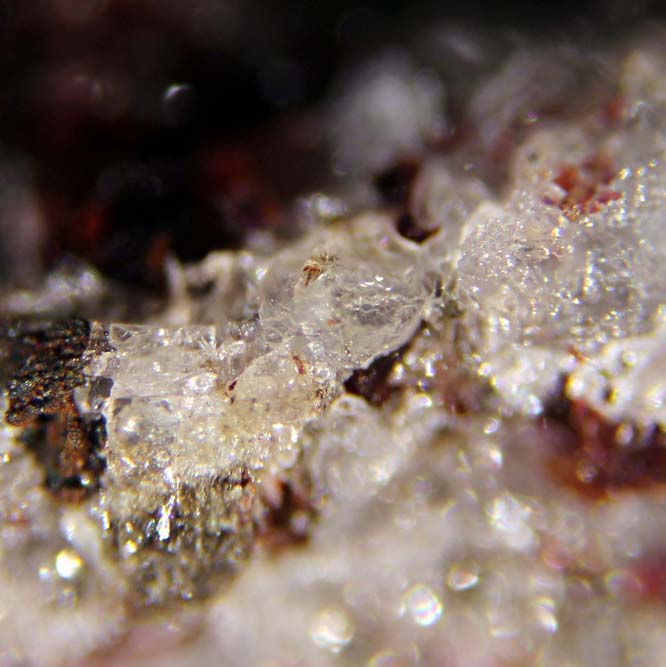
- Arctite crystals

General
- Category: Minerals
- Formula: (Na_{2}Ca_{4}(PO_{4})_{3}F)
- IMA symbol: Arc

Identification
- Color: Colorless
- Mohs scale hardness: 5
- Luster: Vitreous, Sub-Vitreous, Pearly
- Specific gravity: 3.13

Arctite (Na_{2}Ca_{4}(PO_{4})_{3}F) is a colourless mineral found in the Kola Peninsula northern Russia. Its IMA symbol is Arc. It has a Mohs hardness of 5 and has a specific gravity of 3.13. Arctite is transparent with a vitreous lustre. Arctite has a perfect cleavage and a trigonal crystal system. It is also a naturally occurring antiperovskite.

Common associates of arctite include aegirine, natisite, lomonosovite, umbite and thenardite.
