= Aurivillius phases =

Aurivillius phases are a form of perovskite represented by the general formulae is (Bi_{2}O_{2})(A_{n−1}B_{n}O_{3n+1}) (where A is a large 12 co-ordinate cation, and B is a small 6 co-ordinate cation).

Basically, their structure is built by alternating layers of [Bi_{2}O_{2}]^{2+} and pseudo-perovskite blocks, with perovskite layers that are n octahedral layers in thickness. This crystal structure was first described in 1949 by Swedish chemist Bengt Aurivillius. The first interest in Aurivillius phases arose from the observation of ferroelectricity even for the simplest member, Bi_{2}WO_{6} (n=1) of this crystallographic family. The Mo-homologous Aurivillius phase Bi_{2}MoO_{6} was recently investigated as a potential LTCC material. Their oxide ion-conducting properties of Aurivillius phases were first discovered in the 1970s by Takahashi et al., and they have been used too for this purpose ever since.

Aurivillius phase oxide materials are a class of lead-free ceramics.

== See also ==
- Ruddlesden-Popper phase
