= Perovskite (structure) =

Type of crystal structure

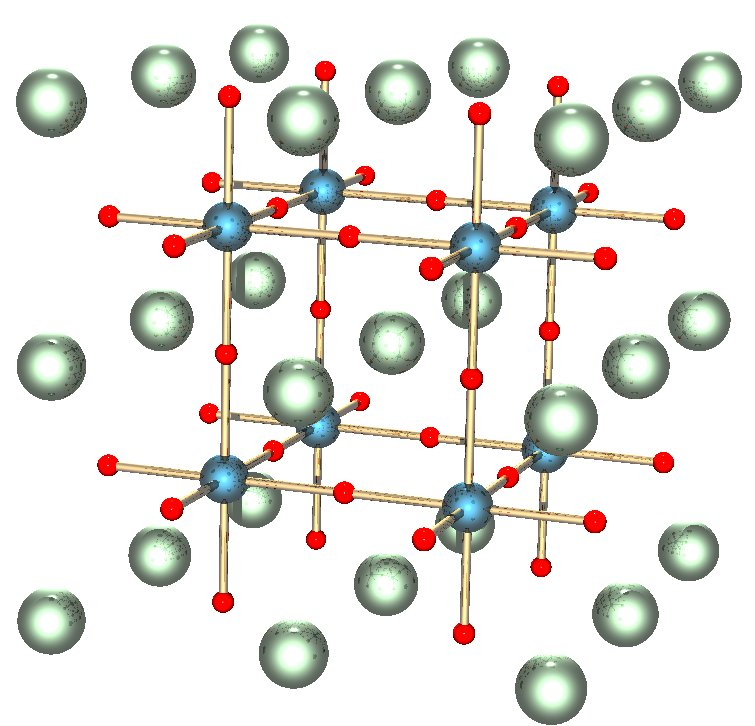
Structure of a perovskite with general chemical formula ABX_{3}. The red spheres are X atoms (usually oxygens), the blue spheres are B atoms (a smaller metal cation, such as Ti^{4+}), and the green spheres are the A atoms (a larger metal cation, such as Ca^{2+}). Pictured is the undistorted cubic structure; the symmetry is lowered to orthorhombic, tetragonal or trigonal in many perovskites.

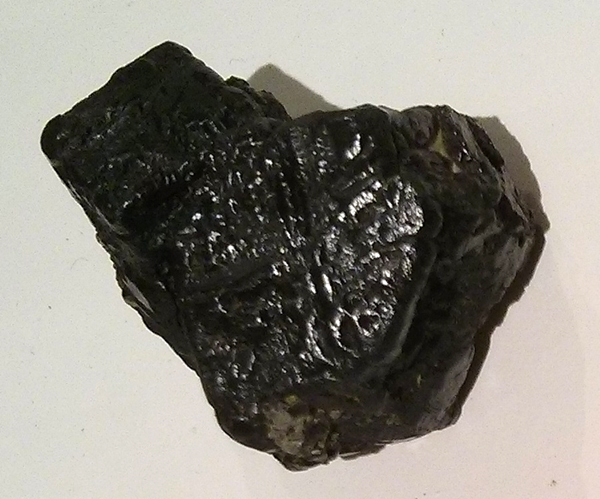
Calcium titanate. The sample is black owing to impurities, typically Fe.

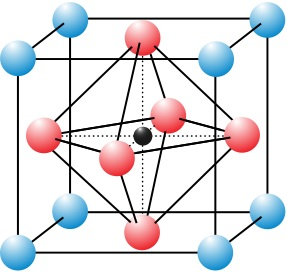
Structure of oxide ABO_{3}. The smaller B ion occupies the center of the "box" with eight A ions at its corners.

A perovskite is a crystalline material of formula ABX_{3} with a crystal structure similar to that of the mineral perovskite, this latter consisting of calcium titanium oxide (CaTiO_{3}). The mineral was first discovered in the Ural mountains of Russia by Gustav Rose in 1839 and named after Russian mineralogist L. A. Perovski (1792–1856). In addition to being one of the most abundant structural families, perovskites have wide-ranging properties and applications.

== Structure ==
Perovskite structures are adopted by many compounds that have the chemical formula ABX_{3}. 'A' and 'B' are positively charged ions (i.e. cations), often of very different sizes, and X is a negatively charged ion (an anion, frequently oxide) that bonds to both cations. The 'A' atoms are generally larger than the 'B' atoms. The ideal cubic structure has the B cation in 6-fold coordination, surrounded by an octahedron of anions, and the A cation in 12-fold cuboctahedral coordination. Additional perovskite forms may exist where both/either the A and B sites have a configuration of A1_{x−1}A2_{x} and/or B1_{y-1}B2_{y} and the X may deviate from the ideal coordination configuration as ions within the A and B sites undergo changes in their oxidation states.

Because of the flexibility of bond angles inherent in the perovskite structure there are many different types of distortions that can occur from the ideal structure. These include tilting of the octahedra, displacements of the cations out of the centers of their coordination polyhedra, and distortions of the octahedra driven by electronic factors (Jahn-Teller distortions). The idealized form is a cubic structure (space group Pm3̅m, no. 221), which is rarely encountered. The orthorhombic (e.g. space group Pnma, no. 62, or Amm2, no. 38) and tetragonal (e.g. space group I4/mcm, no. 140, or P4mm, no. 99) structures are the most common non-cubic variants. Although the perovskite structure is named after CaTiO_{3}, this mineral has a non-cubic structure. SrTiO_{3} and CaRbF_{3} are examples of cubic perovskites. Barium titanate is an example of a perovskite which can take on the rhombohedral (space group R3m, no. 160), orthorhombic, tetragonal and cubic forms depending on temperature.

In the idealized cubic unit cell of such a compound, the type 'A' atom sits at cube corner position (0, 0, 0), the type 'B' atom sits at the body-center position (1/2, 1/2, 1/2) and X atoms (typically oxygen) sit at face centered positions (1/2, 1/2, 0), (1/2, 0, 1/2) and (0, 1/2, 1/2). The diagram to the right shows edges for an equivalent unit cell with A in the cube corner position, B at the body center, and X at face-centered positions.

Four general categories of cation-pairing are possible: A^{+}B^{2+}X^{−}_{3}, or 1:2 perovskites; A^{2+}B^{4+}X^{2−}_{3}, or 2:4 perovskites; A^{3+}B^{3+}X^{2−}_{3}, or 3:3 perovskites; and A^{+}B^{5+}X^{2−}_{3}, or 1:5 perovskites.

The relative ion size requirements for stability of the cubic structure are quite stringent, so slight buckling and distortion can produce several lower-symmetry distorted versions, in which the coordination numbers of A cations, B cations or both are reduced. Tilting of the BO_{6} octahedra reduces the coordination of an undersized A cation from 12 to as low as 8. Conversely, off-centering of an undersized B cation within its octahedron allows it to attain a stable bonding pattern. The resulting electric dipole is responsible for the property of ferroelectricity and shown by perovskites such as BaTiO_{3} that distort in this fashion.

Complex perovskite structures contain two different B-site cations. This results in the possibility of ordered and disordered variants.

== Defect perovskites ==
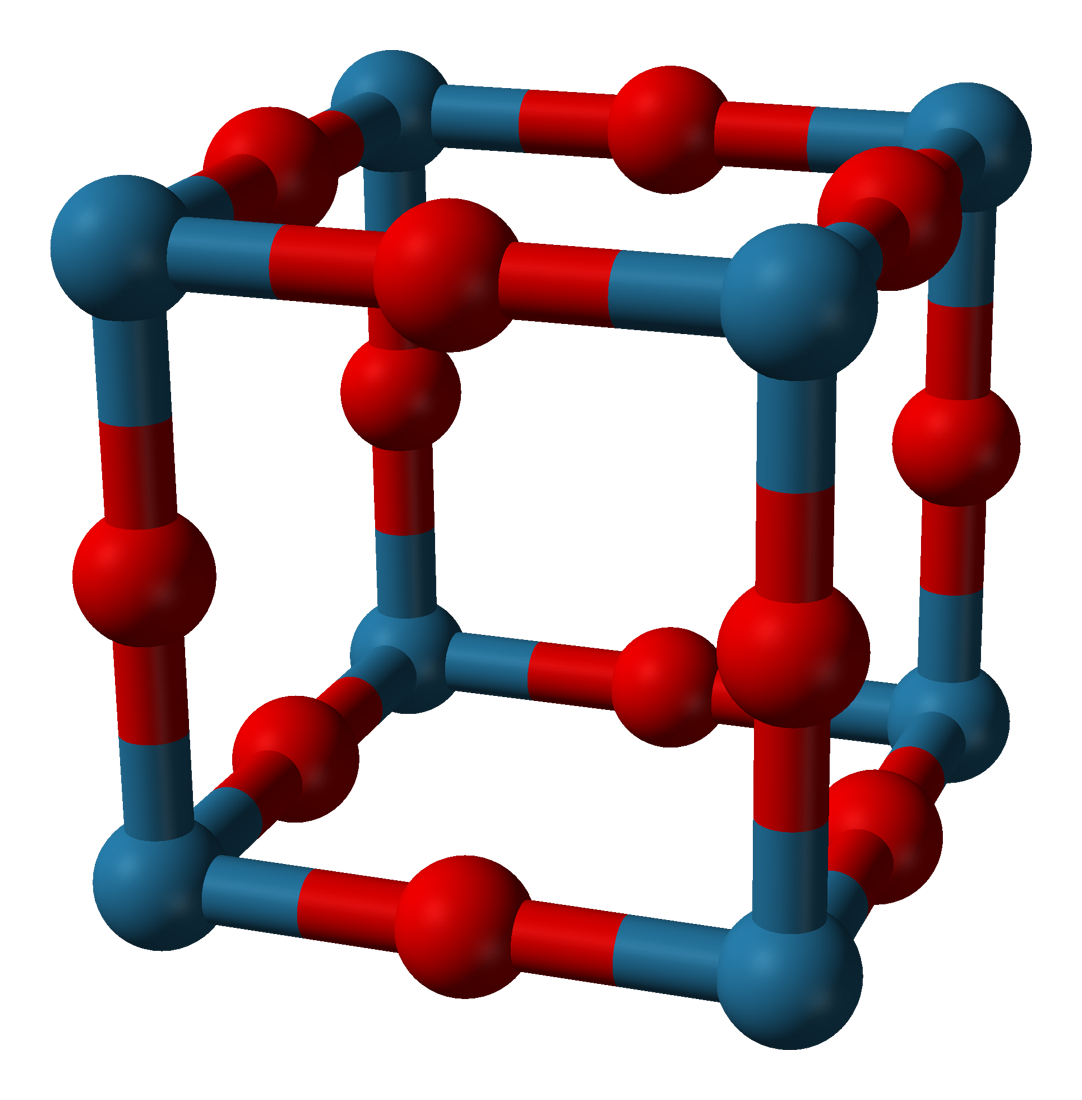
Rhenium trioxide is a simple example of a defect perovskite: the central atom found in classical perovskites is absent.

Also common are the defect perovskites. Instead of the ideal ABO_{3} stoichiometry, defect perovskites are missing some or all of the A, B, or O ions. One example is rhenium trioxide. It is missing the A atoms. Uranium trihydride is another example of a simple defect perovskite. Here, all B sites are vacant, H^{−} occupies the O sites, and the large U^{3+} ion occupies the A site.

Many high temperature superconductors, especially cuprate superconductor, adopt defect perovskite structures. The prime example is yttrium barium copper oxide (YBCO), which has the formula YBa_{2}Cu_{3}O_{7}. In this material Y^{3+} and Ba^{2+}, which are relatively large, occupy all A sites. Cu occupies all B sites. Two O^{2-} ions per formula unit are absent, hence the term defect. The compound YBa_{2}Cu_{3}O_{7} is a superconductor. The average oxidation state of copper is Cu^{(7/3)+} since Y3+ and Ba2+ have fixed oxidation states. When heated in the absence of O_{2}, the solid loses its superconducting properties, relaxes to the stoichiometry YBa_{2}Cu_{3}O_{6.5}, and all copper sites convert to Cu^{2+}. The material thus is an oxygen carrier, shuttling between two defect perovskites:

4 YBa_{2}Cu_{3}O_{7} ⇌ 4 YBa_{2}Cu_{3}O_{6.5} + O_{2}

== Layered perovskites ==
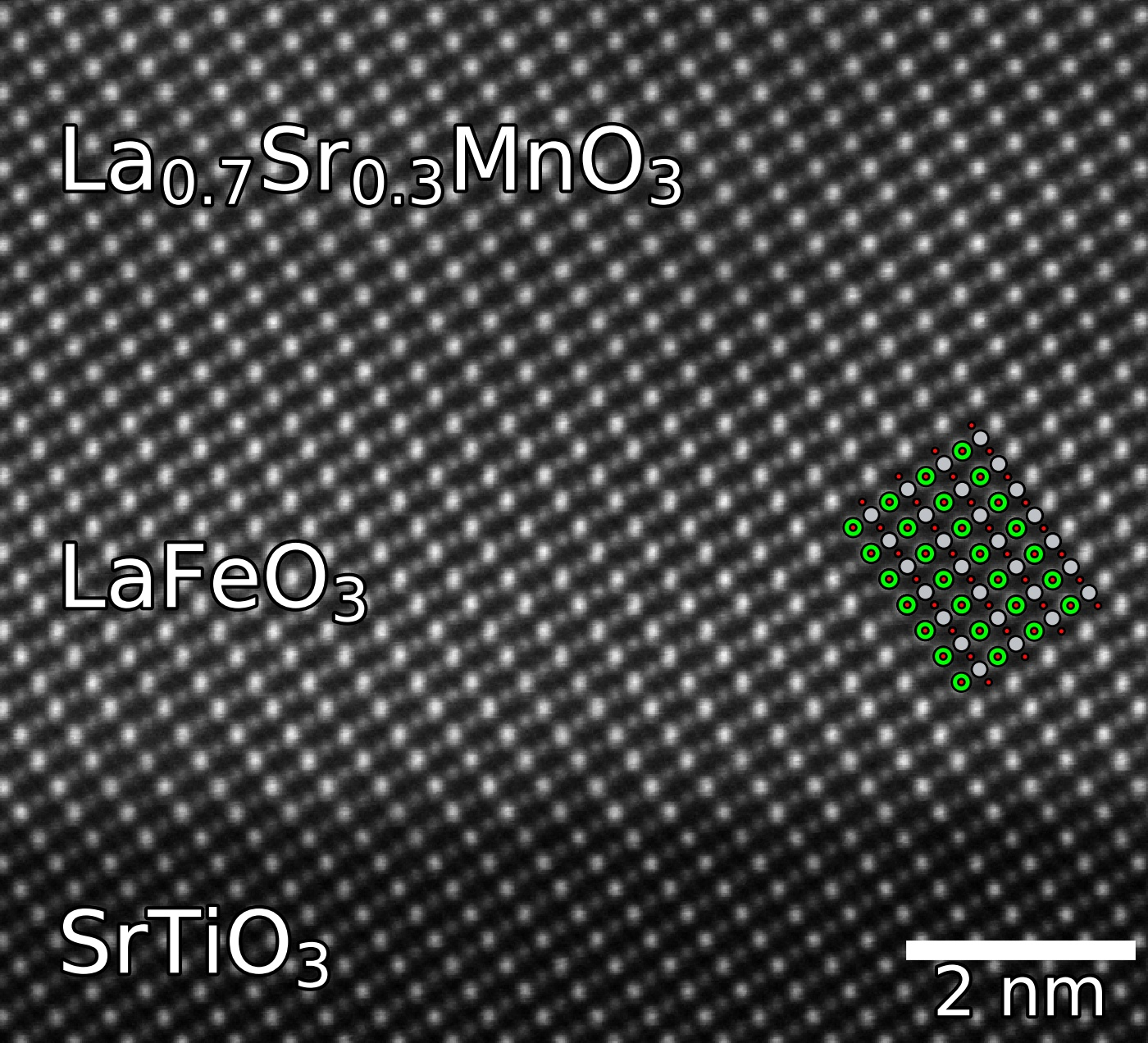
Atomic resolution scanning transmission electron microscopy imaging of a perovskite oxide thin film system. Showing a cross section of a La_{0.7}Sr_{0.3}MnO_{3} and LaFeO_{3} bilayer grown on 111-SrTiO_{3}. Overlay: A-cation (green), B-cation (grey) and oxygen (red).

Perovskites can be deposited as epitaxial thin films on top of other perovskites, using techniques such as pulsed laser deposition and molecular-beam epitaxy. These films can be a couple of nanometres thick or as small as a single unit cell.

Perovskites may be structured in layers, with the ABO_{3} structure separated by thin sheets of intrusive material. Based on the chemical makeup of their intrusions, these layered phases can be defined as follows:

- Aurivillius phase: the intruding layer is composed of a [Bi_{2}O_{2}]^{2+} ion, occurring every n ABO_{3} layers, leading to an overall chemical formula of [Bi_{2}O_{2}]-A_{(n−1)}B_{2}O_{7}. Their oxide ion-conducting properties were first discovered in the 1970s by Takahashi et al., and they have been used for this purpose ever since.
- Dion-Jacobson phase: the intruding layer is composed of an alkali metal (M) every n ABO_{3} layers, giving the overall formula as M^{+}A_{(n−1)}B_{n}O_{(3n+1)}
- Ruddlesden-Popper phase: the simplest of the phases, the intruding layer occurs between every one (n = 1) or multiple (n > 1) layers of the ABO_{3} lattice. Ruddlesden−Popper phases have a similar relationship to perovskites in terms of atomic radii of elements with A typically being large (such as La or Sr) with the B ion being much smaller typically a transition metal (such as Mn, Co or Ni).

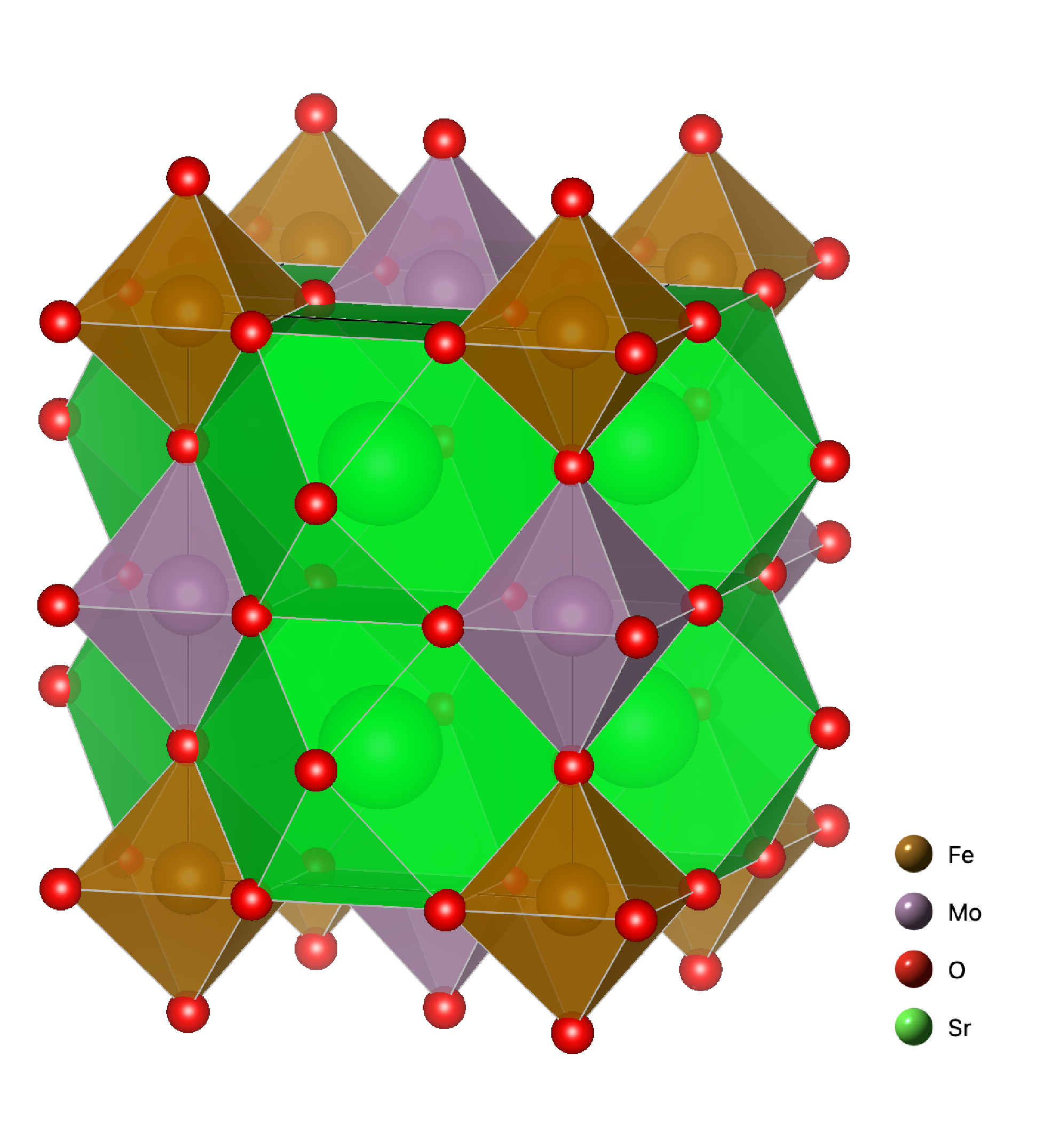
Crystal structure of a double perovskite: Sr_{2}FeMoO_{6}. The Fe and Mo atoms have ordered in a 3D chessboard type fashion.

== Double perovskites ==
Double perovskites are ordered derivatives of the perovskite structure with the general chemical formula A_{2}BB′O_{6}, in which two chemically distinct cations occupy the B site in an ordered manner. From a crystallographic viewpoint, double perovskites can be described as superstructures of the simple ABO_{3} perovskite, where periodic B/B′ ordering leads to a doubling of the primitive perovskite unit cell while preserving the three-dimensional network of corner-sharing octahedra.

The most prevalent ordering motif in double perovskites is rock-salt ordering of the B-site cations, resulting in alternating BO_{6} and B′O_{6} octahedra along all three crystallographic directions. This ordered arrangement lowers the translational symmetry relative to simple perovskites and introduces additional degrees of freedom for structural distortions and symmetry reduction.

=== Symmetry ===
Ideal rock-salt ordered double perovskites commonly adopt the cubic space group Fm3̅m. However, deviations from ideal ionic size ratios and bonding preferences frequently induce octahedral tilting and distortions, analogous to those observed in simple perovskites. These distortions can be systematically classified using Glazer tilt notation, although B-site ordering imposes additional symmetry constraints compared to ABO_{3} systems.

The coupling between B/B′ ordering and octahedral tilting leads to a rich variety of reduced-symmetry structures, with monoclinic (P2_{1}/n) and orthorhombic space groups being particularly common among oxide double perovskites. Such symmetry lowering reflects the combined effects of lattice strain accommodation and cooperative octahedral rotations.

=== Cation ordering, disorder, and defects ===
In practice, perfect long-range B-site ordering is rarely achieved. A characteristic defect in double perovskites is antisite disorder, in which B and B′ cations exchange crystallographic positions. Antisite disorder disrupts the periodic potential associated with ideal rock-salt ordering and can significantly modify structural coherence and physical properties.

The degree of cation ordering is governed by differences in formal charge, ionic radius, and bonding character between the B-site cations, as well as synthesis conditions such as temperature and oxygen partial pressure. Experimental studies, particularly on thin films and epitaxial systems, have shown that ordering can be sensitively tuned through strain and growth conditions, highlighting the close interplay between crystallography and processing.

=== Electronic and magnetic properties ===
B-site ordering in double perovskites has important consequences for electronic and magnetic structure by modifying orbital hybridization, bandwidth, and superexchange pathways. Ordered arrangements of transition-metal cations enable magnetic interactions that are symmetry-forbidden or strongly suppressed in chemically disordered perovskites, leading to a wide range of magnetic ground states.

First-principles calculations further indicate that the double perovskite framework provides a versatile platform for tuning electronic structure through compositional control and ordering, allowing systematic variation of band gaps and carrier characteristics. These trends underscore the central role of crystallographic order in governing structure–property relationships in double perovskites.

== Antiperovskites ==
The lattice of an antiperovskites (or inverse perovskites) is the same as that of the perovskite structure, but the anion and cation positions are switched. The typical perovskite structure is represented by the general formula ABX_{3}, where A and B are cations and X is an anion. When the anion is the (divalent) oxide ion, A and B cations can have charges 1 and 5, respectively, 2 and 4, respectively, or 3 and 3, respectively. In antiperovskite compounds, the general formula is reversed, so that the X sites are occupied by an electropositive ion, i.e., cation (such as an alkali metal), while A and B sites are occupied by different types of anion. In the ideal cubic cell, the A anion is at the corners of the cube, the B anion at the octahedral center, and the X cation is at the faces of the cube. Thus the A anion has a coordination number of 12, while the B anion sits at the center of an octahedron with a coordination number of 6. Similar to the perovskite structure, most antiperovskite compounds are known to deviate from the ideal cubic structure, forming orthorhombic or tetragonal phases depending on temperature and pressure.

Whether a compound will form an antiperovskite structure depends not only on its chemical formula, but also the relative sizes of the ionic radii of the constituent atoms. This constraint is expressed in terms of the Goldschmidt tolerance factor, which is determined by the radii, r_{a}, r_{b} and r_{x}, of the A, B, and X ions.

Tolerance factor = $\frac{(r_a + r_x)}{\sqrt{2}(r_b + r_x)}$

For the antiperovskite structure to be structurally stable, the tolerance factor must be between 0.71 and 1. If between 0.71 and 0.9, the crystal will be orthorhombic or tetragonal. If between 0.9 and 1, it will be cubic. By mixing the B anions with another element of the same valence but different size, the tolerance factor can be altered. Different combinations of elements result in different compounds with different regions of thermodynamic stability for a given crystal symmetry.

=== Examples ===
Antiperovskites naturally occur in sulphohalite, galeite, schairerite, kogarkoite, nacaphite, arctite, polyphite, and hatrurite. It is also demonstrated in superconductive compounds such as CuNNi_{3} and ZnNNi_{3}.

Discovered in 1930, metallic antiperovskites have the formula M_{3}AB where M represents a magnetic element, Mn, Ni, or Fe; A represents a transition or main group element, Ga, Cu, Sn, and Zn; and B represents N, C, or B. These materials exhibit superconductivity, giant magnetoresistance, and other unusual properties. If at least some of the metal ions are Lithium cations, the material is investigated as a possible cathode material in Lithium-ion batteries.

Antiperovskite manganese nitrides exhibit zero thermal expansion.

== Octahedral tilting ==
Beyond the most common perovskite symmetries (cubic, tetragonal, orthorhombic), a more precise determination leads to a total of 23 different structure types that can be found. These 23 structure can be categorized into 4 different so-called tilt systems that are denoted by their respective Glazer notation.

| Tilt System number | Tilt system symbol | Space group |
|---|---|---|
Three-tilt systems
| 1 | a^{+}b^{+}c^{+} | Immm (#71) |
| 2 | a^{+}b^{+}b^{+} | Immm (#71) |
| 3 | a^{+}a^{+}a^{+} | Im3̅ (#204) |
| 4 | a^{+}b^{+}c^{−} | Pmmn (#59) |
| 5 | a^{+}a^{+}c^{−} | Pmmn (#59) |
| 6 | a^{+}b^{+}b^{−} | Pmmn (#59) |
| 7 | a^{+}a^{+}a^{−} | Pmmn (#59) |
| 8 | a^{+}b^{−}c^{−} | A2_{1}/m11 (#11) |
| 9 | a^{+}a^{−}c^{−} | A2_{1}/m11 (#11) |
| 10 | a^{+}b^{−}b^{−} | Pmnb (#62) |
| 11 | a^{+}a^{−}a^{−} | Pmnb (#62) |
| 12 | a^{−}b^{−}c^{−} | F1̅ (#2) |
| 13 | a^{−}b^{−}b^{−} | I2/a (#15) |
| 14 | a^{−}a^{−}a^{−} | R3̅c (#167) |
Two-tilt systems
| 15 | a^{0}b^{+}c^{+} | Immm (#71) |
| 16 | a^{0}b^{+}b^{+} | I4/mmm (#139) |
| 17 | a^{0}b^{+}c^{−} | Bmmb (#63) |
| 18 | a^{0}b^{+}b^{−} | Bmmb (#63) |
| 19 | a^{0}b^{−}c^{−} | F2/m11 (#12) |
| 29 | a^{0}b^{−}b^{−} | Imcm (#74) |
One-tilt systems
| 21 | a^{0}a^{0}c^{+} | C4/mmb (#127) |
| 22 | a^{0}a^{0}c^{−} | F4/mmc (#140) |
Zero-tilt systems
| 23 | a^{0}a^{0}a^{0} | Pm3̅m (#221) |

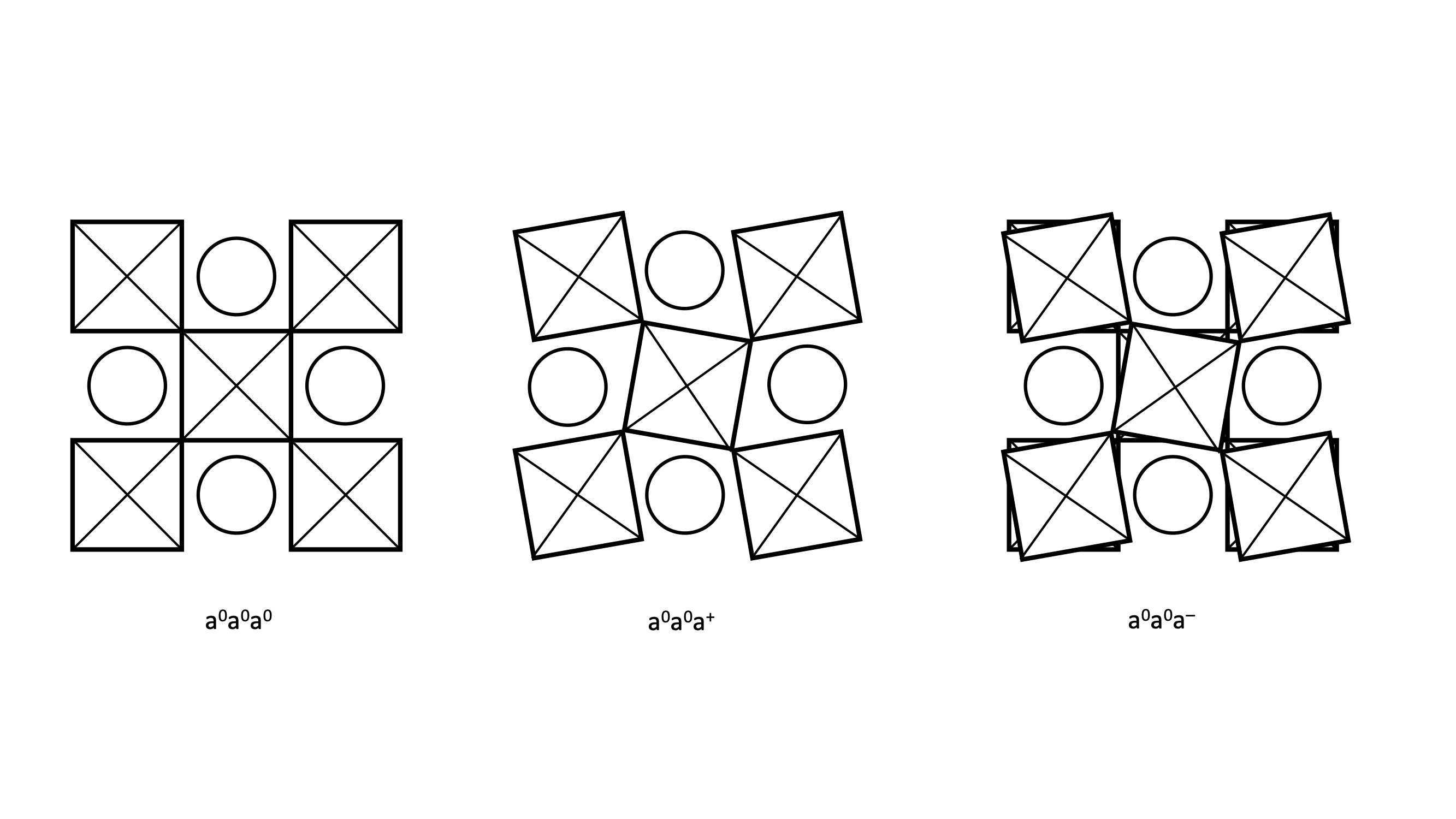
One-tilt and zero-tilt systems in perovskites

The notation consists of a letter a/b/c, which describes the rotation around a Cartesian axis and a superscript +/—/0 to denote the rotation with respect to the adjacent layer. A "+" denotes that the rotation of two adjacent layers points in the same direction, whereas a "—" denotes that adjacent layers are rotated in opposite directions. Common examples are a^{0}a^{0}a^{0}, a^{0}a^{0}a^{–} and a^{0}a^{0}a^{+} which are visualized here.

== Examples ==
=== Minerals ===
Aside from perovskite itself, some perovskite minerals include loparite and bridgmanite. Bridgmanite is a silicate with the chemical formula (Mg,Fe)SiO_{3}. It is the most common mineral in the Earth's mantle. At high pressures associated with the deeper mantel, the Si sites feature octahedral units.

At the high pressure conditions of the Earth's lower mantle, the pyroxene enstatite, MgSiO_{3}, which otherwise has tetrahedral Si sites, transforms into a denser perovskite-structured polymorph; this phase may be the most common mineral in the Earth. This phase has the orthorhombically distorted perovskite structure (GdFeO_{3}-type structure) that is stable at pressures from ~24 GPa to ~110 GPa. However, it cannot be transported from depths of several hundred km to the Earth's surface without transforming back into less dense materials. At higher pressures, MgSiO_{3} perovskite, commonly known as silicate perovskite, transforms to post-perovskite.

=== Inorganic perovskites lacking oxygen ===
Although the most common perovskite compounds contain oxygen, there are a few perovskite compounds that form without oxygen. Fluoride perovskites such as NaMgF_{3} are well known. A large family of metallic perovskite compounds can be represented by RT_{3}M (R: rare-earth or other relatively large ion, T: transition metal ion and M: light metalloids). The metalloids occupy the octahedrally coordinated "B" sites in these compounds. RPd_{3}B, RRh_{3}B and CeRu_{3}C are examples. MgCNi_{3} is a metallic perovskite compound and has received lot of attention because of its superconducting properties. An even more exotic type of perovskite is represented by the mixed oxide-aurides of Cs and Rb, such as Cs_{3}AuO, which contain large alkali cations in the traditional "anion" sites, bonded to O^{2−} and Au^{−} anions.

=== Organic perovskites ===
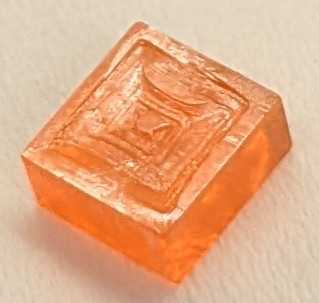
MAPbBr_{3} crystal

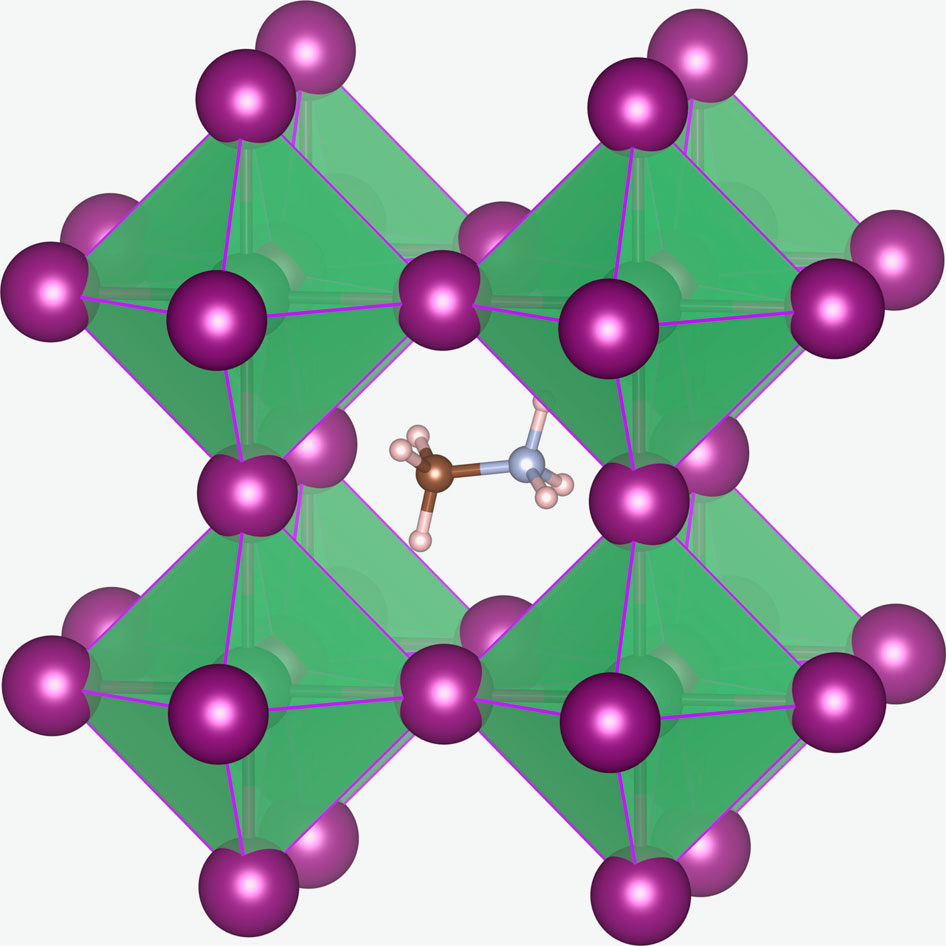
Crystal structure of CH_{3}NH_{3}PbX_{3} perovskites (X=I, Br and/or Cl). The methylammonium cation (CH_{3}NH_{3}^{+}) is surrounded by PbX_{6} octahedra.

Of interest in the context of solar energy are materials of the type [R_{4}N]^{+}[MX_{3}]^{−}. Thus, the quat cation occupies the B site and the metals occupy the A sites.These materials are the basis of perovskite solar cells. These materials have high charge carrier mobility and charge carrier lifetime that allow light-generated electrons and holes to move far enough to be extracted as current, instead of losing their energy as heat within the cell.

== Applications, real and aspirational ==
Perovskites have seen and continue to see extensive research in materials science.

The financially biggest application of perovskites is in ceramic capacitors, which exploit BaTiO_{3}'s high dielectric constant. Other ferroelectric titanates used for similar applications include lithium niobate and lead zirconium titanate.

Light-emitting diodes exploit the high photoluminescence quantum efficiencies of perovskites. They are also applicable to lasers.

This class of materials perform a wide-range of particle detections, including alpha particles and thermal neutrons. Perovskite scintillators have very large radiation conversion. In photoelectrolysis, water electrolysis at 12.3% efficiency can use perovskite photovoltaics.

The physical properties of metal-halide perovskites, particularly when monolithically integrated with thin-film chalcogenides like CIGS, have led to significant interest in their use for space-based infrastructure and orbital data centers. Perovskites are more resistant to radiation than traditional crystalline silicon (c-Si) or gallium arsenide (GaAs) cells and have a higher specific power.

Perovskite-type manganites such as La_{1-x}Sr_{x}MnO_{3} (LSM) are also used as functional electrode materials in high-temperature gas-sensing devices because of their mixed ionic–electronic conductivity and catalytic activity toward nitrogen oxides. Composite electrodes based on LSM combined with noble metals have been shown to produce stable impedimetric responses suitable for exhaust NO_{x} detection in harsh environments.

== See also ==
- Antiperovskite
- Aurivillius phases
- Diamond anvil
- Goldschmidt tolerance factor
- Ruddlesden-Popper phase
- Spinel
