= Kogarkoite =

Sulfate-fluoride mineral

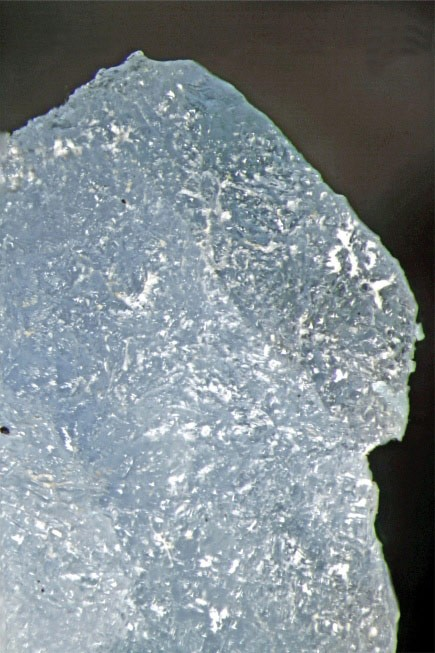

General
- Category: Sulfate mineral
- Formula: Na_{3}(SO_{4})F
- IMA symbol: Kog
- Strunz classification: 7.BD.15
- Crystal system: Monoclinic
- Crystal class: Pyramidal (2/m) (same H-M symbol)
- Space group: P2_{1}/m
- Unit cell: a = 18.07, b = 6.94 c = 11.44 [Å]; β = 107.72°; Z = 12

Identification
- Color: Colorless, pale sky-blue, pale pink, lilac
- Crystal habit: Tabular crystals, granular, earthy aggregates, pseudorhombohedral
- Twinning: Common
- Mohs scale hardness: 3.5
- Luster: Vitreous to dull
- Streak: White
- Diaphaneity: Transparent to translucent
- Specific gravity: 2.66
- Optical properties: Biaxial (+)
- Refractive index: n_{α} = 1.439 n_{β} = 1.439 n_{γ} = 1.442
- Birefringence: δ = 0.003
- 2V angle: Small, approaching zero
- Ultraviolet fluorescence: Cream to pale blue under SW UV and green under LW UV
- Solubility: Slowly soluble in water

Kogarkoite is a sodium sulfate fluoride mineral with formula Na_{3}(SO_{4})F. It has a pale blue color, a specific gravity of about 2.67 and a hardness of 3.5. The crystal is monoclinic and is a type of naturally occurring antiperovskite. Kogarkoite is named after the Russian petrologist Lia Nikolaevna Kogarko (born 1936) who discovered the mineral.

== Discovery and occurrence ==
Kogarkoite was first described in 1973 for an occurrence on Alluaiv Mountain, Lovozero Massif, Kola Peninsula, Russia. On Alluaiv it occurs in pegmatitic veins in nepheline syenite. It occurs with sodalite in syenite xenoliths in an alkali intrusive complex at Mont Saint-Hilaire, Canada. In Hortense Hot Spring, Chaffee County, Colorado, it occurs as a sublimate. It occurs at Lake Natron near Ol Doinyo Lengai, Tanzania and Suswa Volcano, Lake Magadi, Kenya.

== See also ==
- List of minerals
- List of minerals named after people
