= Karin Aurivillius =

Swedish chemist and crystallographer

- Born: 1920
- Died: 1982 (aged 61–62)
- Education: Stockholm University
- Known for: Crystal structures of mercury compounds
- Spouse: Bengt Aurivillius
- Scientific career
- Fields: Chemistry, crystallography
- Institutions: University of Lund; Atomic Energy Research Establishment, Didcot
- Thesis: The structural chemistry of inorganic mercury (II) compounds: some aspects of the determination of the positions of "light" atoms in the presence of "heavy" atoms in crystal structures. (1965)

Karin Aurivillius (1920–1982) was a Swedish chemist and crystallographer at the University of Lund, Sweden. She determined the crystal structures of many mercury compounds. During the 1960s, Aurivillius helped develop crystallography in Sweden while working closely with her prominent husband and fellow chemist, Bengt Aurivillius (1918–1994), who was a professor of inorganic chemistry at Lund University.

To reveal the structural chemistry of inorganic mercury (II) oxide or sulphide compounds, she studied crystal structures using X-rays and neutron diffraction methods. Some of her research was conducted at the Institute of Atomic Energy Research at the Atomic Energy Research Establishment (AERE) located in Didcot, Oxfordshire, United Kingdom. The extremely rare mineral aurivilliusite was named in honor of Karin Aurivillius, for "her significant contributions to the crystal chemistry of mercury-bearing inorganic compounds."

== Life ==
Karin Aurivillius was born in 1920. She wrote her doctoral dissertation at Stockholm University in 1965, titled The structural chemistry of inorganic mercury (II) compounds: some aspects of the determination of the positions of "light" atoms in the presence of "heavy" atoms in crystal structures. She was a chemist and crystallographer at the University of Lund in Sweden. She determined the crystal structures of many mercury compounds.

During the 1960s, Aurivillius helped develop crystallography in Sweden while working closely with her prominent husband and fellow chemist, Bengt Aurivillius (1918–1994), who was a professor of inorganic chemistry at Lund University. To reveal the structural chemistry of inorganic mercury (II) oxide or sulphide compounds, she studied crystal structures using X-rays and neutron diffraction methods. Some of her research was conducted at the Institute of Atomic Energy Research at the Atomic Energy Research Establishment (AERE) located in Didcot, Oxfordshire, United Kingdom.

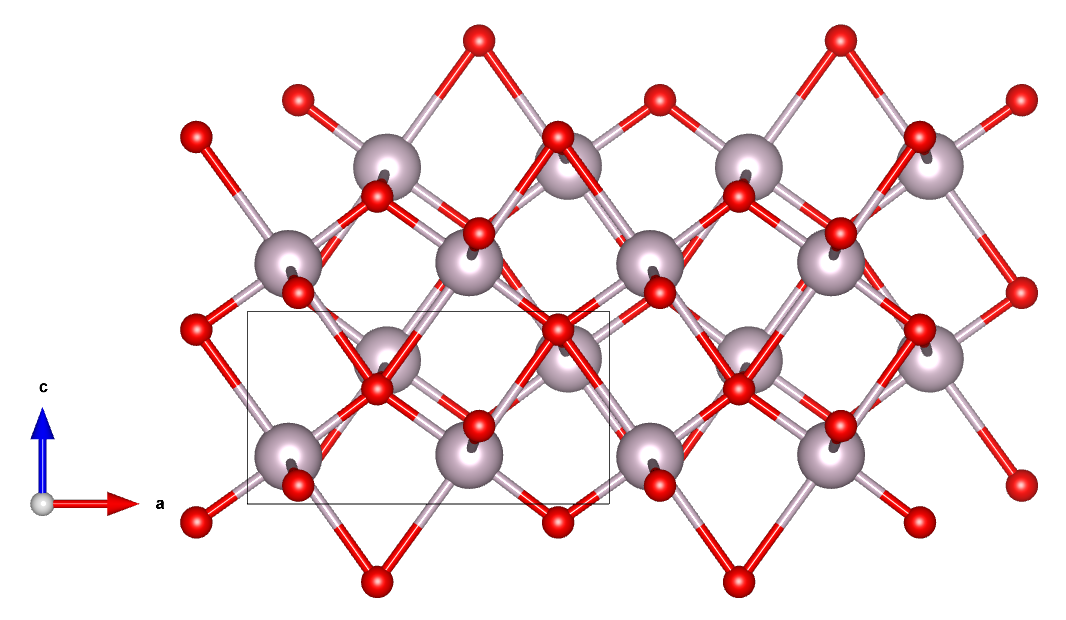
Montroydite crystal structure (Aurivillius 1964) along the b axis. (Created with the help of the free structure program VESTA and the CIF data from Karin Aurivillius: Least-squares refinement of the crystal structures of orthorhombic HgO and of Hg2O2NaI.)

Aurivillius died in 1982.

== Honors ==
The extremely rare mineral aurivilliusite was named in honor of Karin Aurivillius, for "her significant contributions to the crystal chemistry of mercury-bearing inorganic compounds." The mineral is dark grey-black with a dark red-brown streak and has been found at a small prospect pit near the abandoned Clear Creek mercury mine, New Idria district, San Benito County, California.

== Selected works ==
- Aurivillius, K. "The crystal structure of mercury (II) oxide studied by X-ray and neutron diffraction methods." Acta Chemica Scandinavica 10 (1956): 852–866.
- Aurivillius, K. The structural chemistry of inorganic mercury (II) compounds: some aspects of the determination of the positions of" light" atoms in the presence of" heavy" atoms in crystal structures. Diss. 1965.
- Aurivillius, K., and I.-B. Carlsson. "The structure of hexagonal mercury (II) oxide." Acta Chemica Scandinavica 12 (1958): 1297.
- Aurivillius, Karin, and Bo Arne Nilsson. "The crystal structure of mercury (II) phosphate, Hg3 (PO4) 2." Z. Kristallogr 141.1-2 (1975): 1-10.
- Aurivillius, Karin, and Claes Stålhandske. "A reinvestigation of the crystal structures of HgSO4 and CdSO4." Zeitschrift für Kristallographie-Crystalline Materials 153.1-2 (1980): 121–129.
- Aurivillius, K., and L. Folkmarson. "The crystal structure of terlinguaite Hg4O2Cl2." Acta Chemica Scandinavica 22 (1968): 2529–2540.
- AURIVILLIUS, KARIN, and BIRGITTA MALMROS. "Studies on sulphates, selenates and chromates of mercury (II)." Acta Chem. Scand 15.9 (1961): 1932–1938.
- Aurivillius, K., and G-I. Bertinsson. "Structures of complexes between metal halides and phosphinothioethers or related ligands. X.[1, 9-Bis (diphenylphosphino)-3, 7-dithianonane] monoiodonickel tetraphenylborate." Acta Crystallographica Section B: Structural Crystallography and Crystal Chemistry 36.4 (1980): 790–794.
