= Perovskite =

Calcium titanium oxide mineral

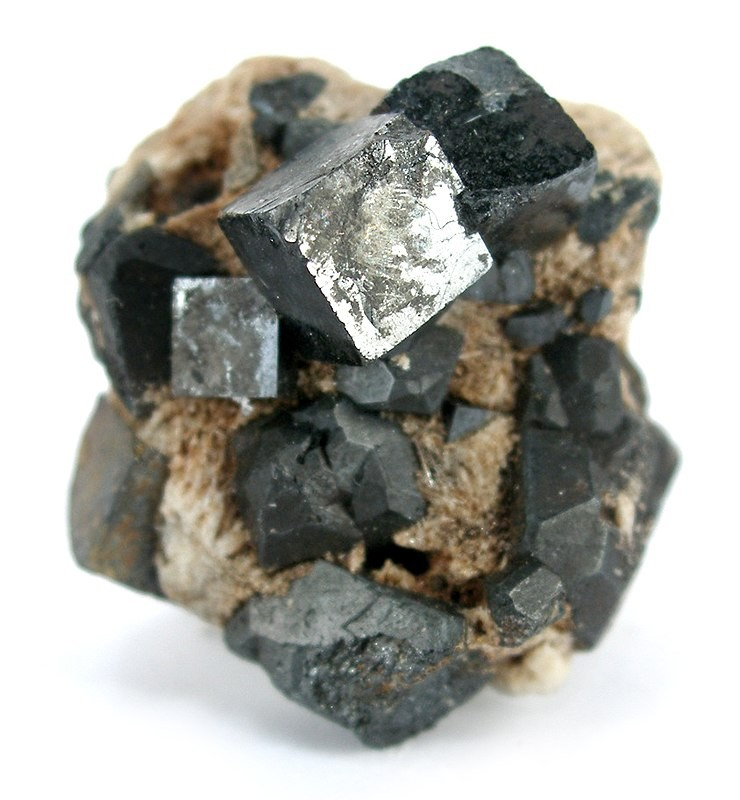
- Crystals of perovskite on matrix Size: 2.3 cm × 2.1 cm × 2.0 cm (0.9 in × 0.8 in × 0.8 in)

General
- Category: Oxide minerals
- Formula: CaTiO_{3}
- IMA symbol: Prv
- Strunz classification: 4.CC.30
- Crystal system: Orthorhombic
- Crystal class: Dipyramidal (mmm); H-M symbol: (2/m 2/m 2/m)
- Space group: Pbnm

Identification
- Formula mass: 135.96 g/mol
- Color: Black, reddish brown, pale yellow, yellowish orange
- Crystal habit: Pseudo cubic – crystals show a cubic outline
- Twinning: complex penetration twins
- Cleavage: [100] good, [010] good, [001] good
- Fracture: Conchoidal
- Mohs scale hardness: 5.0–5.5
- Luster: Adamantine to metallic; may be dull
- Streak: grayish white
- Diaphaneity: Transparent to opaque
- Specific gravity: 3.98–4.26
- Optical properties: Biaxial (+)
- Refractive index: n_{α} = 2.3, n_{β} = 2.34, n_{γ} = 2.38
- Other characteristics: non-radioactive, non-magnetic

Perovskite (pronunciation: /pəˈrɒvskaɪt/) is an orthorhombic calcium titanium oxide mineral composed of calcium titanate (chemical formula CaTiO_{3}). Its name is also applied to the class of compounds which have the same type of crystal structure as CaTiO_{3}, known as the perovskite structure, which has a general chemical formula A^{2+}B^{4+}(X^{2−})_{3} for chalcogen (group 16) perovskites, or A^{1+}B^{2+}(X^{1−})_{3} for the halogen (group 17) perovskites (the kind typically found in modern photovoltaics like photodiodes and solar panels). Many different cations can be embedded in this structure, allowing the development of diverse engineered materials.

== History ==
The mineral was discovered in the Ural Mountains of Russia by Gustav Rose in 1839 and is named after Russian mineralogist Lev Perovski (1792–1856). Perovskite's notable crystal structure was first described by Victor Goldschmidt in 1926 in his work on tolerance factors. The crystal structure was later published in 1945 from X-ray diffraction data on barium titanate by Helen Dick Megaw.

== Occurrence ==
Found in the Earth's mantle, perovskite's occurrence at Khibina Massif is restricted to the silica under-saturated ultramafic rocks and foidolites, due to the instability in a paragenesis with feldspar. Perovskite occurs as small anhedral to subhedral crystals filling interstices between the rock-forming silicates.

Perovskite is found in contact carbonate skarns at Magnet Cove, Arkansas, US, in altered blocks of limestone ejected from Mount Vesuvius, in chlorite and talc schist in the Urals and Switzerland, and as an accessory mineral in alkaline and mafic igneous rocks, nepheline syenite, melilitite, kimberlites and rare carbonatites. Perovskite is a common mineral in the Ca-Al-rich inclusions found in some chondritic meteorites.

The stability of perovskite in igneous rocks is limited by its reaction relation with sphene. In volcanic rocks perovskite and sphene are not found together, the only exception being an etindite from Cameroon.

A rare-earth-bearing variety knopite with the chemical formula (Ca,Ce,Na)(Ti,Fe)O_{3} is found in alkali intrusive rocks in the Kola Peninsula and near Alnö, Sweden. A niobium-bearing variety dysanalyte occurs in carbonatite near Schelingen, Kaiserstuhl, Germany.

=== In stars and brown dwarfs ===
In stars and brown dwarfs the formation of perovskite grains is responsible for the depletion of titanium oxide in the photosphere. Stars with a low temperature have dominant bands of TiO in their spectrum; as the temperature gets lower for stars and brown dwarfs with an even lower mass, CaTiO_{3} forms and at temperatures below 2000 K TiO is undetectable. The presence of TiO is used to define the transition between cool M-dwarf stars and the colder L-dwarfs.

== Physical properties ==
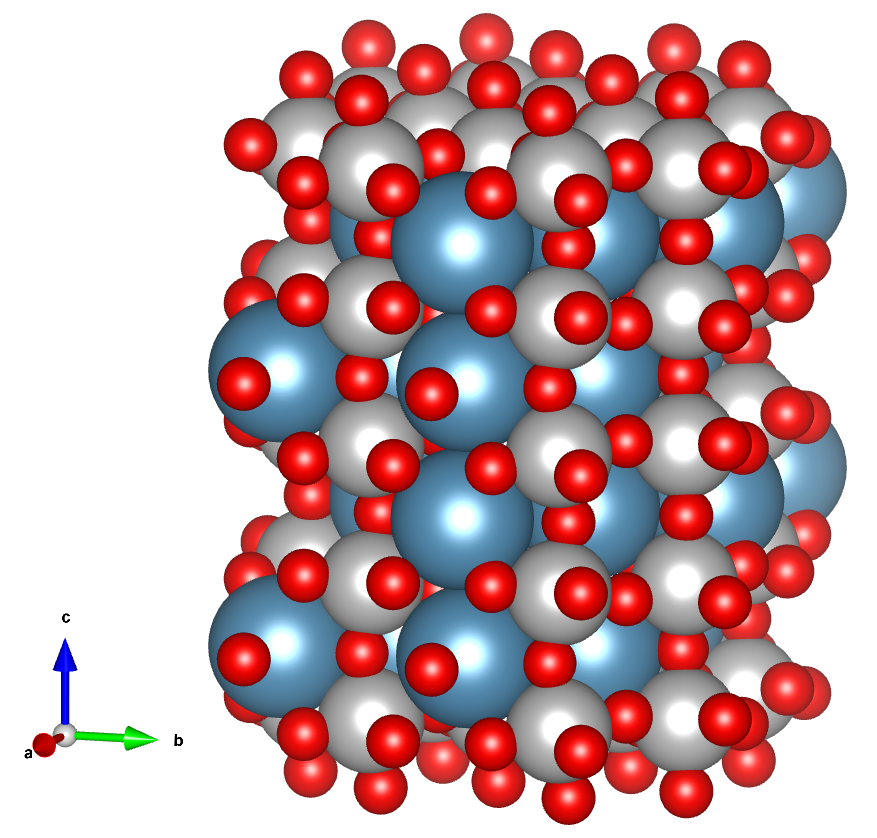
Crystal structure of perovskite CaTiO_{3}; red=oxygen, grey=titanium, blue=calcium

The eponymous Perovskite CaTiO_{3} crystallizes in the Pbnm space group (No. 62) with lattice constants a = 5.39 Å, b = 5.45 Å and c = 7.65 Å.

Perovskites have a nearly cubic structure with the general formula ABO_{3}. In this structure the A-site ion, in the center of the lattice, is usually an alkaline earth or rare-earth element. B-site ions, on the corners of the lattice, are 3d, 4d, and 5d transition metal elements. The A-site cations are in 12-fold coordination with the anions, while the B-site cations are in 6-fold coordination. A large number of metallic elements are stable in the perovskite structure if the Goldschmidt tolerance factor t is in the range of 0.75 to 1.0.

$$t = \frac{R_{\rm A} + R_{\rm O}}{\sqrt2 \left(R_{\rm B} + R_{\rm O}\right)},$$

where R_{A}, R_{B} and R_{O} are the ionic radii of A and B site elements and oxygen, respectively. The stability of perovskites can be characterized with the tolerance and octahedral factors. When conditions are not fulfilled, a layered geometry for edge-sharing or face-sharing octahedra or lower B-site coordination is preferred. These are good structural bounds, but not an empirical prediction.

Perovskites have sub-metallic to metallic luster, colorless streak, and cube-like structure along with imperfect cleavage and brittle tenacity. Depending on the exact compositions, colors include black, brown, gray, orange to yellow. Perovskite crystals may appear to have the cubic crystal form, but are often pseudocubic and actually crystallize in the orthorhombic system, as is the case for CaTiO_{3} (strontium titanate, with the larger strontium cation in the A-site, is cubic). Perovskite crystals have been mistaken for galena; however, galena has a better metallic luster, greater density, perfect cleavage and true cubic symmetry.

== Perovskite derivatives ==
=== Double perovskites ===
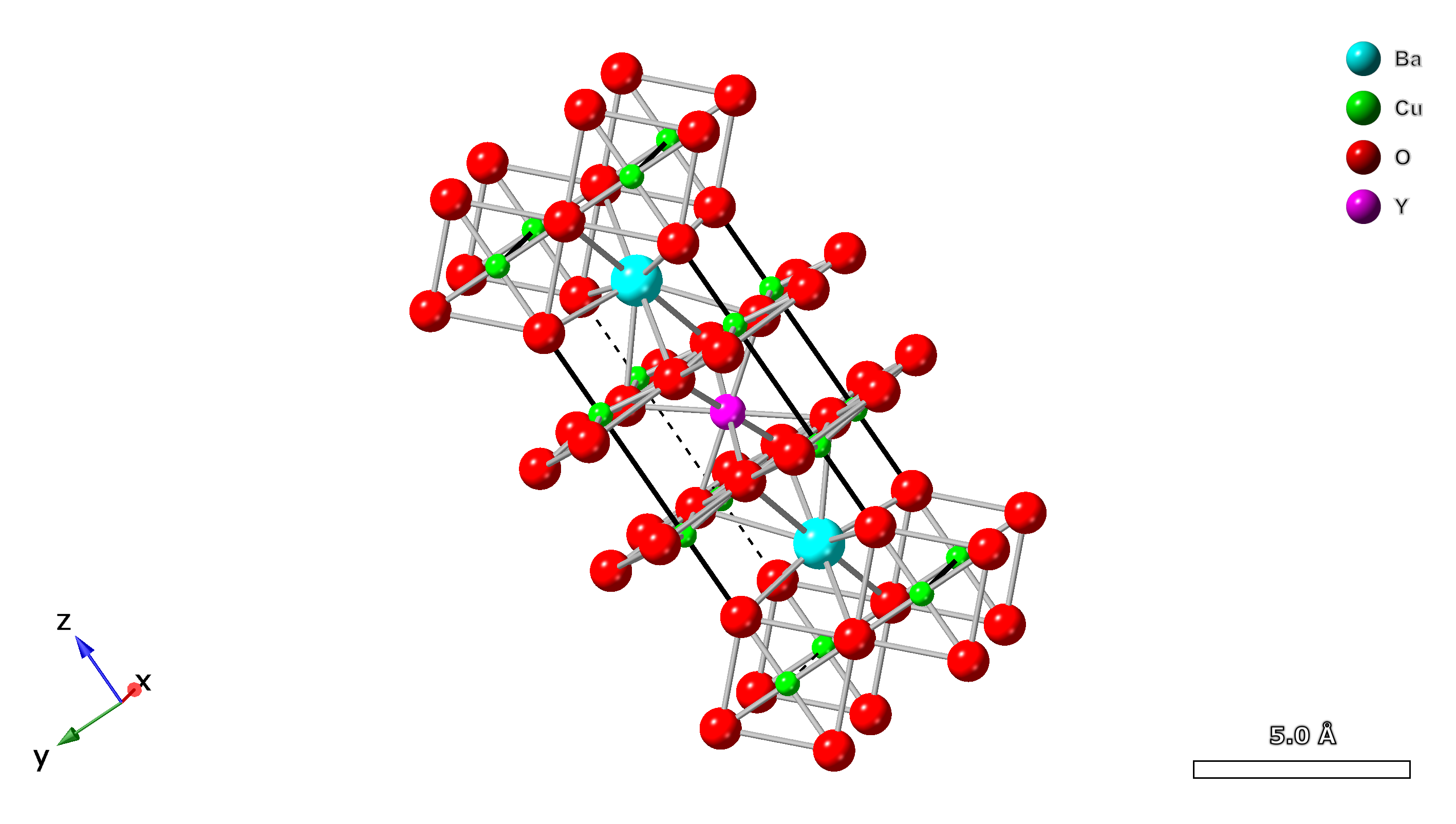
Crystal structure of a typical double perovskite: YBa_{2}Cu_{3}O_{7} (purple = Y, blue = Ba, green = Cu, red = O)

Double perovskites are an important subclass of perovskite-related materials with the general chemical formula A_{2}BB′O_{6}, in which two chemically distinct cations occupy the B site of the perovskite lattice. Compared with simple ABO_{3} perovskites, the introduction of B-site ordering increases crystallographic complexity, leading to symmetry reduction, additional distortion modes, and a wider range of physical properties.

==== Crystallographic principles and ordering mechanisms ====
Double perovskites can be regarded as ordered superstructures of simple perovskites, where periodic B/B′ cation ordering enlarges the primitive perovskite unit cell. The B and B′ cations lead to different ordering schemes, which are rock salt, columnar, and layered structures. Rock salt is an alternating, three-dimensional checkerboard of B and B' polyhedra. This structure is the most common from an electrostatic point of view, as the B sites will have different valence states. Columnar arrangement can be viewed as sheets of B-cation polyhedral viewed from the [111] direction. Layered structures are seen as sheets of B′ and B polyhedra.

==== Common distortion modes and Glazer tilt patterns ====
As in simple perovskites, deviations from ideal ionic size ratios in double perovskites frequently induce octahedral tilting and distortions. These distortion modes can be described using Glazer tilt notation, although the presence of B-site ordering imposes additional symmetry constraints. The coupling between B/B′ ordering and octahedral tilting leads to a variety of reduced-symmetry structures, with monoclinic and orthorhombic phases commonly observed in oxide double perovskites.

==== Electronic and magnetic structure trends ====
B-site ordering in double perovskites strongly modifies electronic structure by altering orbital hybridization, bandwidth, and superexchange pathways. In many transition-metal systems, this ordering enables magnetic interactions that are absent or suppressed in chemically disordered perovskites, giving rise to diverse magnetic ground states and tunable electronic behavior. Electronic structure calculations further indicate that compositional tuning within the double perovskite framework provides a versatile route for engineering band gaps and carrier transport characteristics.

==== Defect chemistry and antisite disorder ====
In real materials, perfect B-site ordering is rarely achieved. A common defect in double perovskites is antisite disorder, in which B and B′ cations exchange lattice positions. Antisite disorder disrupts the periodic potential associated with ideal ordering and can substantially modify magnetic, electronic, and transport properties. The extent of antisite disorder depends sensitively on synthesis conditions, cation similarity, and thermal history, making defect control a central challenge in double perovskite materials.

==== Representative functional materials ====
The structural flexibility of double perovskites has enabled a broad range of functional materials. Oxide double perovskites have been explored for applications involving magnetism, ferroelectricity, catalysis, and energy conversion, where functional behavior is often closely linked to cation ordering and lattice distortions. Related halide and lead-free double perovskites extend the same ordering principles to different bonding regimes, highlighting the generality of the double perovskite concept across oxide and halide chemistries.

=== Lower dimensional perovskites ===
Using the metal halide octahedral as a building block, perovskites are subcategorized into 3D, 2D, 1D, or 0D to describe the arrangement of the octahedral units. 3D perovskites form when there is a smaller cation in the A site so BX_{6} octahedra can be corner shared. 2D perovskites form when the A-site cation is larger so octahedra sheets are formed. In 1D perovskites, a chain of octahedra is formed while in 0D perovskites, individual octahedra are separated from each other. Generally, as the dimensions of a crystal are reduced, a material's band gap and carrier confinement increase, while carrier transport worsens. Both 1D and 0D perovskites lead to quantum confinement and are investigated for lead-free perovskite solar cell materials.

=== Lead halide perovskites ===
Lead halide perovskites are a class of metal halide perovskite semiconductors, commonly described by the formula ABX_{3}, in which A is a monovalent cation such as cesium, methylammonium or formamidinium, B is Pb^{2+}, and X is a halide anion such as iodide, bromide or chloride. They have been widely studied for optoelectronic applications including solar cells, light-emitting diodes, photodetectors, lasers and scintillators because of their strong optical absorption, high carrier mobility, long diffusion lengths and tunable composition-dependent properties.

A related subclass, layered lead halide perovskites, consists of structures in which the metal-halide octahedra are separated by larger organic cations, producing reduced-dimensional phases such as Ruddlesden–Popper and Dion–Jacobson perovskites; these materials are widely investigated because they can offer improved environmental stability, although charge transport is often more anisotropic and less favorable than in three-dimensional phases.

Lead halide perovskites are also frequently described as defect-tolerant relative to many conventional solution-processed semiconductors, although the extent and meaning of this defect tolerance remain active topics of research. Their wider use is limited by concerns including long-term instability under heat, moisture, light and electrical bias, ion migration, and the toxicity of lead-containing compounds.

=== Lead-free halide perovskites ===
In recent years, considerable attention has focused on lead-free halide perovskites, driven by concerns over the toxicity and environmental instability of Pb-based compounds. Candidate replacements for Pb^{2+} include Sn^{2+}, Ge^{2+}, Bi^{3+}, Sb^{3+}, and double perovskite combinations. These alternatives aim to preserve the desirable optoelectronic properties of lead halide perovskites, such as defect tolerance, long carrier lifetimes, and strong optical absorption, however they often display reduced stability.

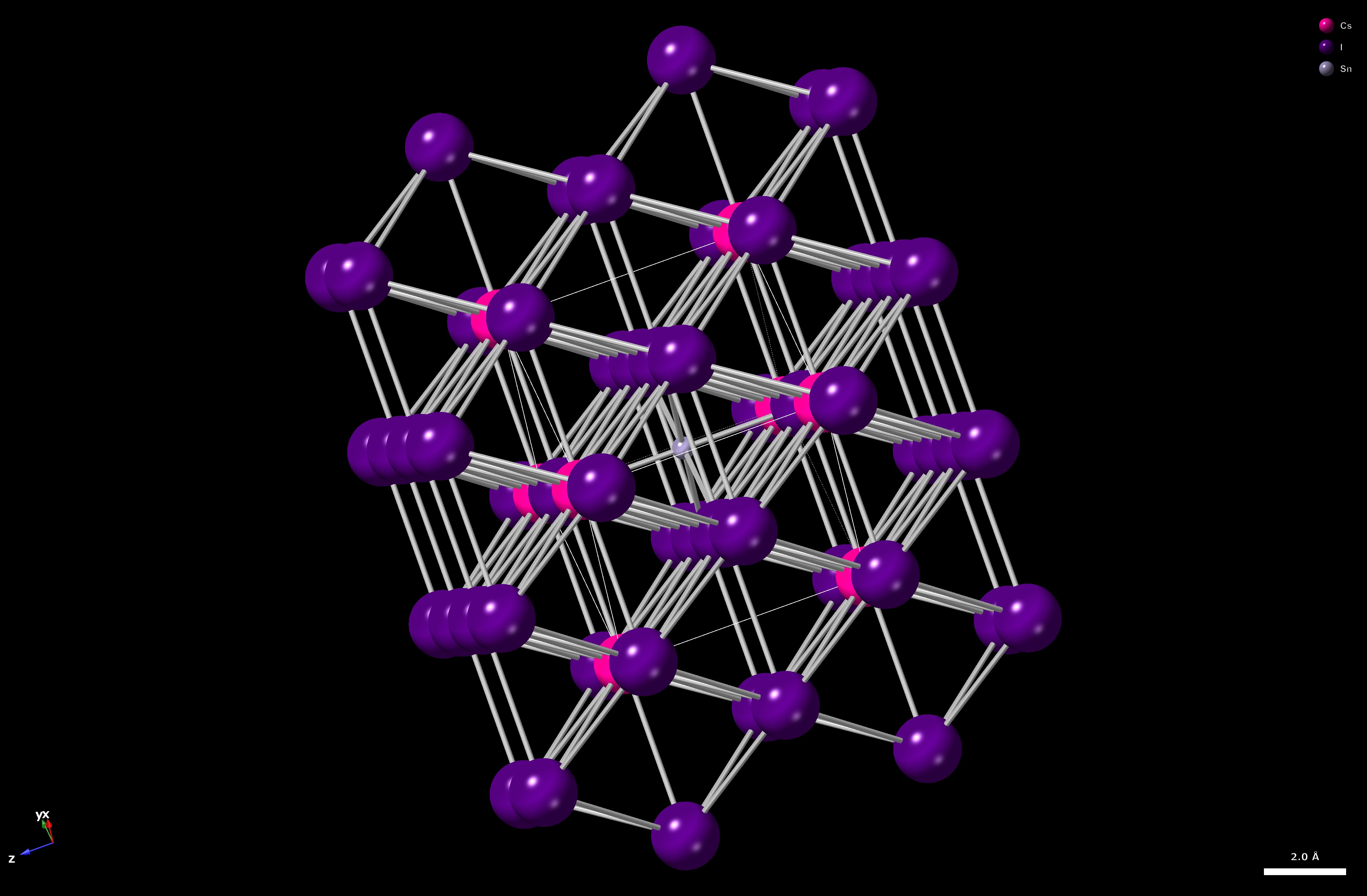
Structure of lead-free halide perovskite CsSnI_{3}. Structure is similar to CaTiO_{3} and its space group is Pm3̅m. (Pink = Cs, silver = Sn, purple = I.)

=== Chiral perovskites ===
The first chiral perovskite was a 1D chiral-perovskite single crystal found in 2003, and the first 2D chiral-perovskite single crystal was found in 2006. The chiroptical study has not been performed until 2017, where Ahn et al explored the circular dichroism performance of (R/S-MBA)PbI_{4}. After that, new kinds of chiral perovskites were found, such as chiral-perovskite nanocrystals, cogels, nanoplatelets, and low-dimensional chiral perovskites.

The chiral transfer mechanisms of chiral perovskites include ligand-induced chiral inorganic structure, chiral distortion of the inorganic surface, chiral patterning of the surface ligands, chiral field effect, and chirality through environments. These different mechanisms lead to different designs of chiral perovskite synthesis. The idea of chirality through chiral ligands leads to the methods of direct synthesis using chiral ligands, post-synthetic chiral ligand exchange, chiral-ligand-assisted reprecipitation, and the chiral-ligand-assisted tip-sonication method. On the other hand, chirality can be introduced by the environment, via chiral solvents, strains, self-assembly on chiral templates.

=== Metal-free perovskites ===
Metal-free perovskites are a class of perovskite-related materials in which the framework contains no metal cations; in the best known examples, the general formula is A(NH_{4})X_{3}, where A is an organic cation and X is a halide. Interest in this class increased substantially after the report of a family of metal-free three-dimensional perovskite ferroelectrics based on MDABCO–NH_{4}X_{3} (X = Cl, Br, I), which showed spontaneous polarization values comparable to those of some inorganic ferroelectrics. These materials have been studied as alternatives to conventional metal-containing halide perovskites, particularly for photonic and optoelectronic applications, because they can combine wide band gaps, low optical loss and the absence of toxic heavy metals. Metal-free perovskites have attracted particular interest for nonlinear optics and terahertz photonics: methyl-DABCO ammonium iodide has been reported to show terahertz emission by optical rectification, while metal-free ferroelectric halide perovskites have also been reported to exhibit visible photoluminescence correlated with local ferroelectricity, and related compositions have been investigated as semiconductor-core optical fibers with second-order optical nonlinearity. Although the field is less developed than that of inorganic and hybrid metal halide perovskites, metal-free perovskites illustrate how perovskite-like structural chemistry can be extended to entirely molecular frameworks.

== See also ==
- Perovskite nanocrystal
- Perovskite light-emitting diode
- Perovskite solar cell
- Post-perovskite
- Silicate perovskite
