= Lev Perovski =

Russian nobleman and mineralogist

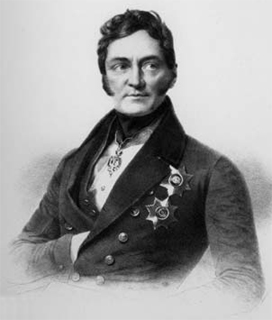
- Born: 9 September 1792
- Died: 21 November 1856 (aged 64)
- Education: Imperial Moscow University

Count Lev Alekseyevich von Perovski (Russian: Лев Алексе́евич Перо́вский, also transliterated as Perofsky, Perovskii, Perovskiy, Perovsky, Perowski, and Perowsky; also credited as L.A. Perovski) (9 September 1792 – 21 November 1856) was a Russian nobleman and mineralogist who also served as Minister of Internal Affairs under Nicholas I of Russia.

In 1845, he proposed the creation of the Russian Geographical Society.

The mineral perovskite is named after him.

== See Also ==
- Perovskite nanocrystal
