= Calcium titanate =

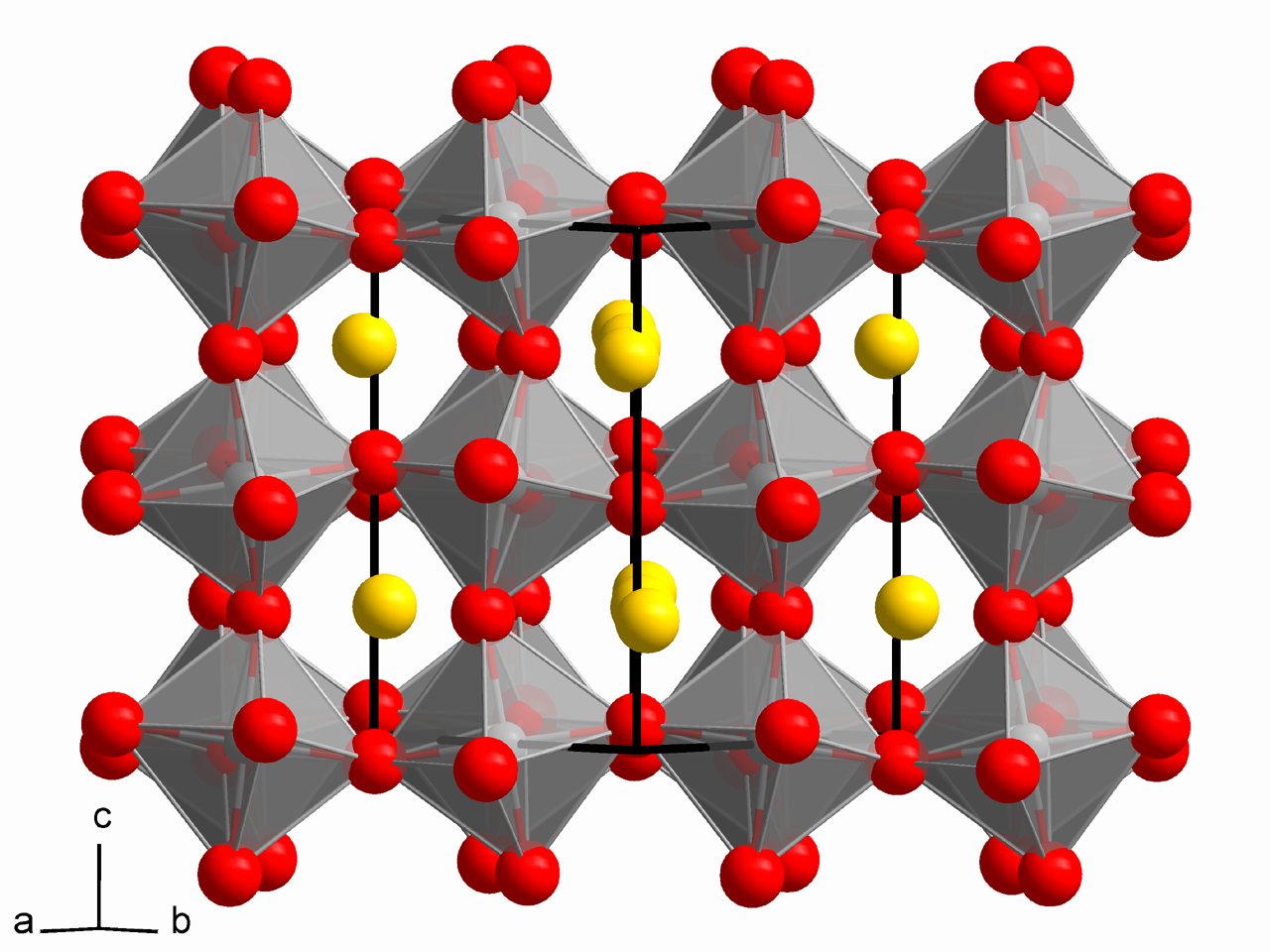

Names
- Other names calcium titanium oxide

Identifiers
| CAS Number | 12049-50-2 |
| 3D model (JSmol) | Interactive image |
| ChemSpider | 17340234 |
| ECHA InfoCard | 100.031.795 |
| PubChem CID | 16212381 |
| RTECS number | XR2568666 |
| UNII | 6RX87EZD0Z |
| CompTox Dashboard (EPA) | DTXSID70890839 DTXSID60583622, DTXSID70890839 |
- InChI: InChI=1S/Ca.3O.Ti/q+2;;2*-1; Key: AOWKSNWVBZGMTJ-UHFFFAOYSA-N; InChI=1/Ca.3O.Ti/q+2;;2*-1;/rCa.O3Ti/c;1-4(2)3/q+2;-2 Key: AOWKSNWVBZGMTJ-SLQOSCGQAQ
- SMILES: [Ca+2].[O-][Ti]([O-])=O

Properties
| Chemical formula | CaTiO_{3} |
| Molar mass | 135.943 g/mol |
| Appearance | white powder |
| Density | 4.1 g/cm^{3} |
| Melting point | 1,975 °C (3,587 °F; 2,248 K) |
| Boiling point | 3,000 °C (5,430 °F; 3,270 K) |
| Solubility in water | insoluble |

Hazards
- Lethal dose or concentration (LD, LC)
| LD_{50} (median dose) | >1200 mg/kg (oral, rat) |

Thermochemistry
| Std molar entropy (S^{⦵}_{298}) | 93.64 J/mol·K |
| Std enthalpy of formation (Δ_{f}H^{⦵}_{298}) | −1660.630 kJ/mol |
| Gibbs free energy (Δ_{f}G^{⦵}) | −1575.256 kJ/mol |
- Except where otherwise noted, data are given for materials in their standard state (at 25 °C [77 °F], 100 kPa). verify (what is ?) Infobox references

Calcium titanate is an inorganic compound with the chemical formula CaTiO_{3}. As a mineral, it is called perovskite, named after Russian mineralogist, Lev Perovski (1792–1856). It is a colourless, diamagnetic solid, although the mineral is often coloured owing to impurities.

== Synthesis ==
CaTiO_{3} can be prepared by the combination of CaO and TiO_{2} at temperatures >1300 °C. Sol-gel processes has been used to make a more pure substance, as well as lowering the synthesis temperature. These compounds synthesized are more compressible due to the powders from the sol-gel process as well and bring it closer to its calculated density (~4.04 g/ml).

== Structure ==
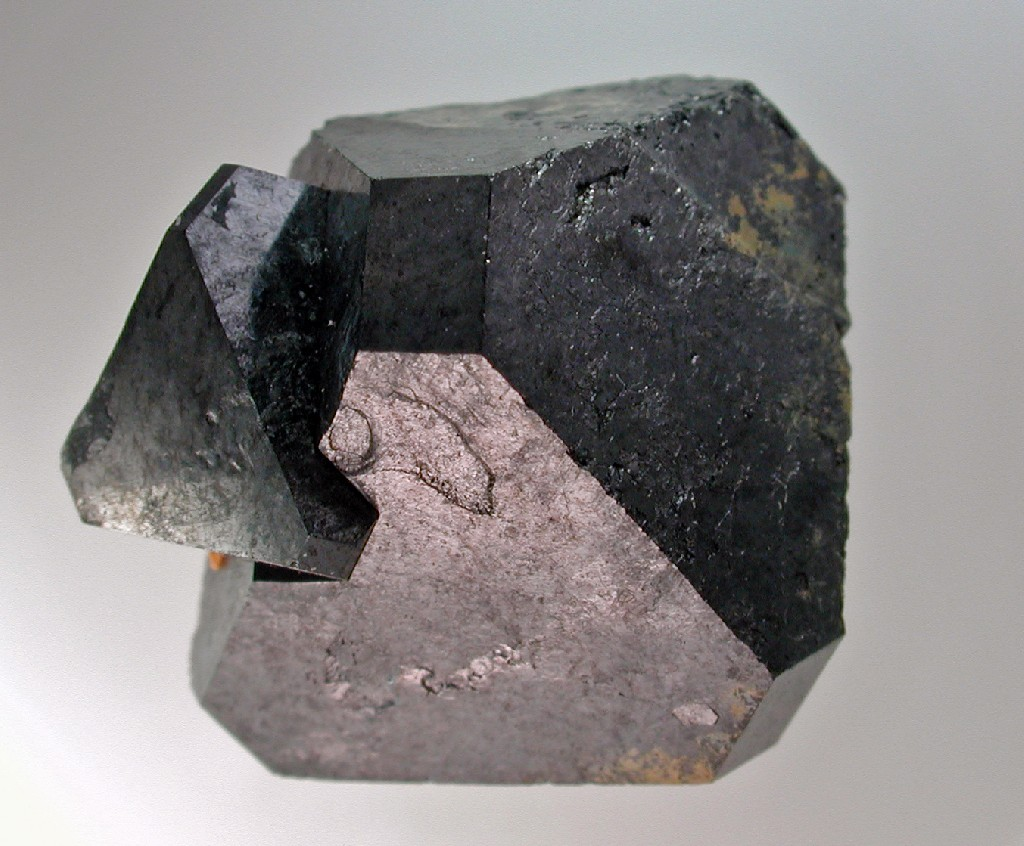
Perovskite (CaTiO_{3}) crystal from Perovskite Hill, Magnet Cove, Arkansas, USA. Calcium titanate naturally occurs in this form.

Calcium titanate is obtained as orthorhombic crystals, more specifically perovskite structure. In this motif, the Ti(IV) centers are octahedral and the Ca^{2+} centers occupy a cage of 12 oxygen centers. Many useful materials adopt related structures, e.g. barium titanate or variations of the structure, e.g. yttrium barium copper oxide.

== Applications ==
Calcium titanate has relatively little value except as one of the ores of titanium, together with several others. It is reduced to give titanium metal or ferrotitanium alloys.

== See also ==
- Perovskite
- Perovskite (structure)
- Perovskite solar cell
