= Umbite =

Potassium zirconosilicate mineral

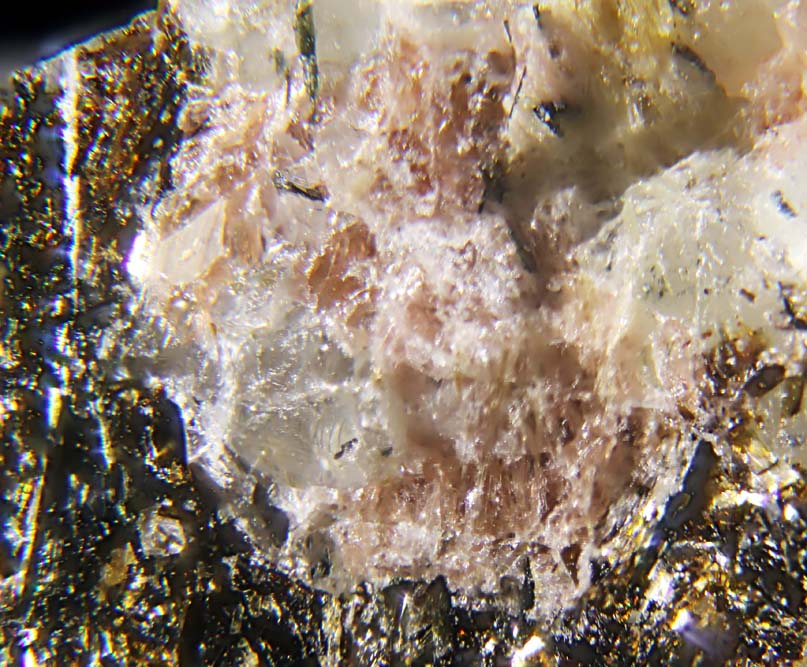
- Pinkish white crystals of the rare zirconium mineral umbyte named after the Lake Umb, 20 km east of the type occurrence in Vuonnemiok River Valley (Khibiny Massif, Murmansk Oblast, Russian Federation.

General
- Category: Inosilicates
- Formula: K_{2}ZrSi_{3}O_{9}·H_{2}O
- IMA symbol: Umb
- Strunz classification: 9.DG.25
- Crystal system: Orthorhombic
- Crystal class: Disphenoidal (222); H-M symbol: (222)
- Space group: P2_{1}2_{1}2_{1}
- Unit cell: a = 10.2 Å, b = 13.24 Å c = 7.17 Å; Z = 4

Identification
- Color: colorless, light yellow
- Luster: vitreous

Umbite (chemical formula K_{2}(Zr,Ti)Si_{3}O_{9}·H_{2}O) is a potassium zirconosilicate mineral found in northern Russia. Named after Lake Umb (Lake Umbozero), its type locality is Vuonnemiok River Valley, Khibiny Massif, Kola Peninsula, Murmanskaja Oblast', Northern Region, Russia.
