= Goldschmidt tolerance factor =

Factor used to determine the compatibility of an ion with a crystal structure

Goldschmidt's tolerance factor (from the German word Toleranzfaktor) is an indicator for the stability and distortion of crystal structures. It was originally only used to describe the perovskite ABO_{3} structure, but now tolerance factors are also used for ilmenite.

Alternatively the tolerance factor can be used to calculate the compatibility of an ion with a crystal structure.

The first description of the tolerance factor for perovskite was made by Victor Moritz Goldschmidt in 1926.

== Mathematical expression ==
The Goldschmidt tolerance factor ($t$) is a dimensionless number that is calculated from the ratio of the ionic radii:

$t={r_A+r_O \over \sqrt{2}(r_B+r_O)}$
r_{A} is the radius of the A cation.	r_{B} is the radius of the B cation.	r_{O} is the radius of the anion (usually oxygen).

In an ideal cubic perovskite structure, the lattice parameter (i.e., length) of the unit cell (a) can be calculated using the following equation:

$a=\sqrt{2}(r_A+r_O)=2(r_B+r_O)$
r_{A} is the radius of the A cation.	r_{B} is the radius of the B cation.	r_{O} is the radius of the anion (usually oxygen).

== Perovskite structure ==
The perovskite structure has the following tolerance factors (t):

Goldschmidt tolerance factor (t)	Structure	Explanation	Example	Example lattice
>1	Hexagonal or Tetragonal	A ion too big or B ion too small.	BaNiO_{3}; BaTiO_{3} (t=1.0617）	-
0.9-1	Cubic	A and B ions have ideal size.	SrTiO_{3}	
0.71 - 0.9	Orthorhombic/Rhombohedral	A ions too small to fit into B ion interstices.	GdFeO_{3} (Orthorhombic); CaTiO_{3} (Orthorhombic)	
<0.71	Different structures	A ions and B have similar ionic radii.	Ilmenite, FeTiO_{3} (Trigonal)	

== See also ==
- Goldschmidt classification
- Victor Goldschmidt
