= Ruddlesden-Popper phase =

Type of crystal structure

Ruddlesden-Popper (RP) phases are a type of perovskite structure that consists of two-dimensional perovskite-like slabs interleaved with cations. The general formula of an RP phase is A_{n+1}B_{n}X_{3n+1}, where A and B are cations, X is an anion (e.g., oxygen), and n is the number of octahedral layers in the perovskite-like stack. Generally, it has a phase structure that results from the intergrowth of perovskite-type and NaCl-type (i.e., rocksalt-type) structures.

These phases are named after S.N. Ruddlesden and P. Popper, who first synthesized and described a Ruddlesden-Popper structure in 1957.

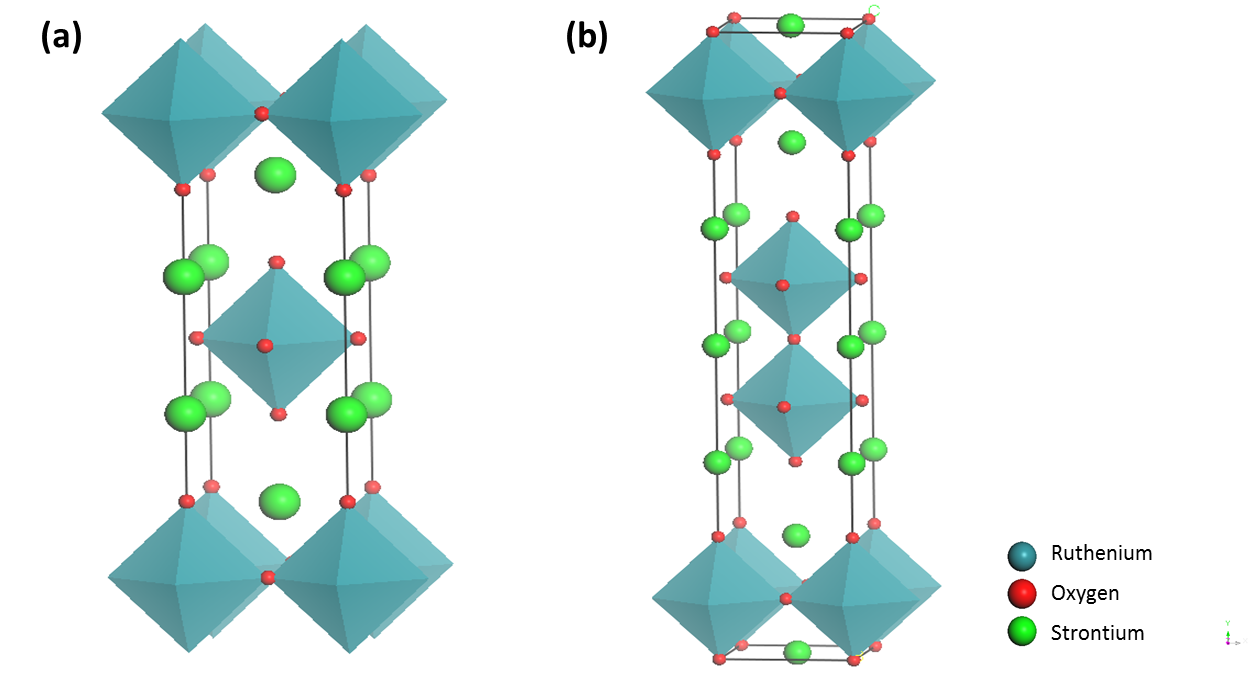
The unit cell of Ruddlesden-Popper phases (a) Sr_{2}RuO_{4} (n = 1) and (b) Sr_{3}Ru_{2}O_{7} (n = 2). The polyhedra are part of the perovskite-like layers. In these examples A = A' = Sr^{2+}.

== Crystal structure ==
The general RP formula A_{n+1}B_{n}X_{3n+1} can be written A_{n−1}A′_{2}B_{n}X_{3n+1}, where A and A′ are alkali, alkaline earth, or rare earth metals and B is a transition metal. The A cations are located in the perovskite layer and are 12-fold cuboctahedral coordinated by the anions (CN = 12). The A′ cations have a coordination number of 9 (CN = 9) and are located at the boundary between the perovskite layer and an intermediate block layer. The B cations are located inside the anionic octahedra, pyramids and squares.

== Synthesis ==
The first series of Ruddlesden-Popper phases, Sr_{2}TiO_{4}, Ca_{2}MnO_{4} and SrLaAlO_{4}, were confirmed by powder X-ray diffraction (PXRD) in 1957. These compounds were formed by heating up the appropriate oxides and carbonates in the correct proportions.

In recent years, interest in perovskite-like structures has been growing and methods for synthesizing these compounds have been further developed. In contrast to the conventional solid-state method, chimie douce or soft chemistry techniques are often utilized to synthesize this class of materials. These soft chemistry techniques include ion-exchange reactions of layered perovskites, ion-exchange reactions involving interlayer structural units, topochemical condensation reactions and other techniques such as intercalation-deintercalation reactions and multistep intercalation reactions of layer perovskite.

== Applications ==
Similar to the parent perovskite phases, Ruddlesden-Popper phases can possess interesting properties such as colossal magnetoresistance, superconductivity, ferroelectricity, and catalytic activity, and have applications as white light-emitting diodes, scintillators, fuel cells, and solar cells.

Using Ruddlesden-Popper perovskite as light-emitting diodes has the advantages of low-cost solution-processing, tunable bandgap, and better stability compared to 3D perovskite. In 2018, Mohite et al. achieved a 14 hours stable operation of 2D (CH_{3}(CH_{2})_{3}NH_{3})_{2}(CH_{3}NH_{3})_{n−1}Pb_{n}I_{3n+1} Ruddlesden-Popper perovskite thin films as light-emitting diodes under operating conditions, while 3D perovskite as light-emitting diodes could degrade within minutes.

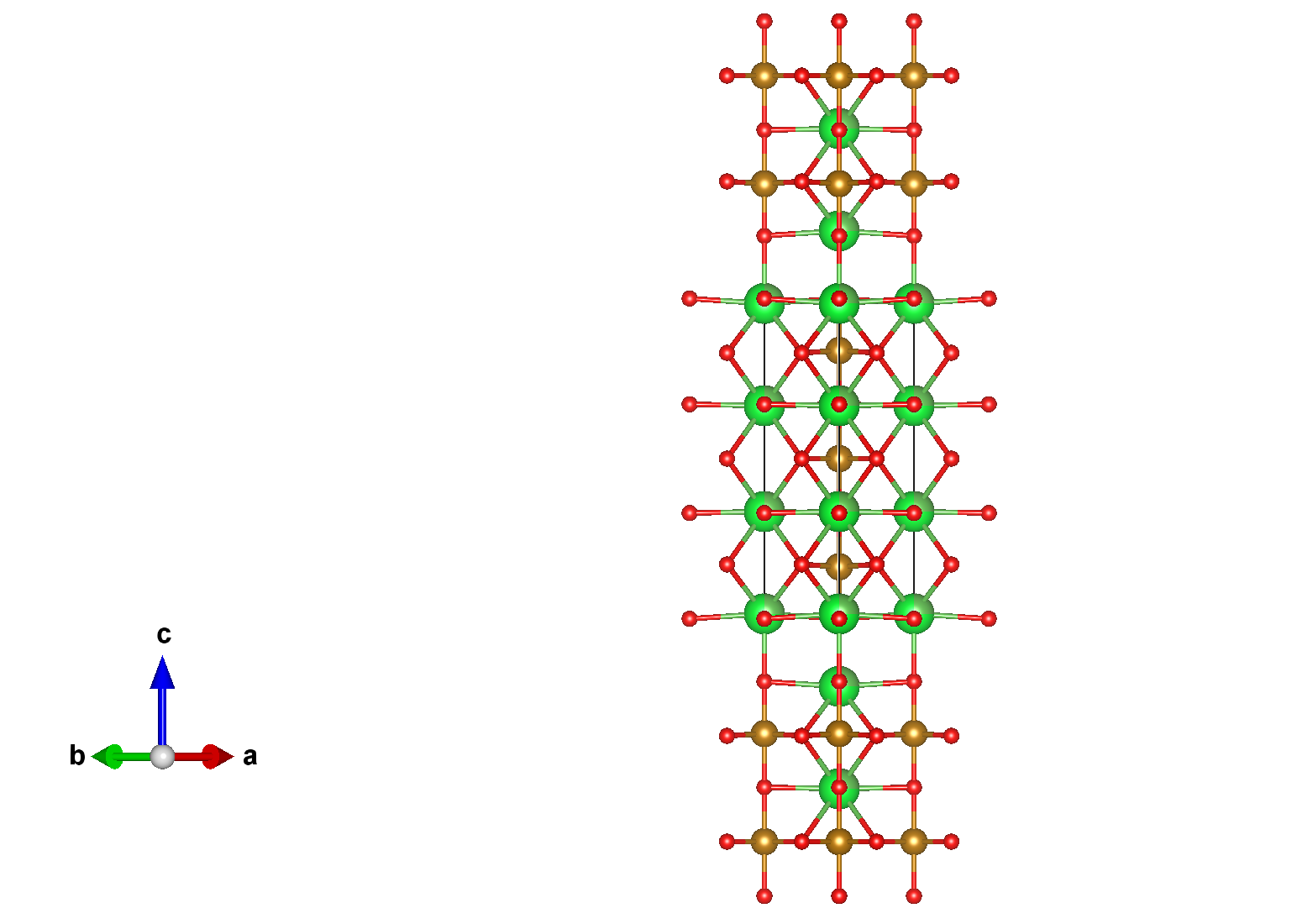
Structure of the LaSr_{3}Fe_{3}O_{10} Ruddlesden–Popper phase, which is a layered perovskite.

The Ruddlesden-Popper phase LaSr_{3}Fe_{3}O_{10} is an example of a layered perovskite being developed for use in rechargeable metal-air batteries. Due to the layered nature of Ruddlesden-Popper structures, the oxygen located between the perovskite layers is easily removed. The ease of removing the oxygen atoms is responsible for the efficiency of the oxygen evolution reaction (OER) and oxygen reduction reaction (ORR) in the material. In a metal-air battery, OER is the process of charging that occurs at the air electrode, while ORR is the discharging reaction.

The Ruddlesden-Popper phase perovskites are also prospective candidate materials in energy storage devices. The formula of (R−NH_{3})_{2}A_{n−1}B_{n}X_{3n+1} is being developed for solar cells. Here, R−NH_{3}^{+} is long organic chain or cyclic ammonium cation, A is methylamine (MA) or formamidine (FA), B is Pb or Sn, and X is halogen ions. The Ruddlesden-Popper perovskites can also be used for cathode materials of solid oxide fuel cells (SOFC)
