= Josep Fontcuberta =

Spanish materials physicist

Josep Fontcuberta Griñó
- Born: 1953 (age 72–73); Barcelona, Spain
- Education: University of Barcelona
- Awards: IEEE Magnetics Society Distinguished Lecturer (2016)
- Scientific career
- Workplaces: University of Barcelona; Institute of Materials Science of Barcelona (ICMAB-CSIC)
- Thesis: (1982)

Josep Fontcuberta Griñó (born 1953) is a Spanish materials physicist and research professor who has worked on functional oxides, magnetism, multiferroics, and oxide electronics. He has been a senior scientist at the Institute of Materials Science of Barcelona (ICMAB-CSIC) and has contributed to the development of oxide thin films for spintronic, ferroelectric, and energy-related applications.

== Early life and education ==
Fontcuberta was born in Barcelona. He obtained his Bachelor’s and Master’s degree in Physics in 1977 from the University of Barcelona and completed his Ph.D. in Physics there in 1982. Following his doctorate, he carried out postdoctoral research at the Laboratoire de Cristallographie of the CNRS in Grenoble, and later at the Inorganic Chemistry Laboratory of the University of Oxford, where he worked in the research groups of Jean-Claude Joubert and John B. Goodenough.

== Academic career ==
After returning to Barcelona, Fontcuberta joined the University of Barcelona, and later became a professor of condensed matter physics. In 1990, he moved to the Institut de Ciència de Materials de Barcelona (ICMAB-CSIC), where he contributed to the establishment of a laboratory and research group focused on magnetism and superconductivity.

Since 2000, he has been a full research professor at ICMAB, coordinating research within the Multifunctional Thin Films and Complex Structures (MULFOX) laboratory. He later became Professor ad honorem at ICMAB-CSIC.

== Research ==
Fontcuberta’s research has addressed functional oxide materials within the broader context of condensed matter physics and materials science, with particular attention to systems in which electronic, magnetic, and structural degrees of freedom are strongly coupled. Much of his work has focused on transition‑metal oxides, studied mainly in the form of epitaxial thin films and artificial heterostructures.

Part of his research activity has concerned the growth and characterization of oxide thin films, where he has examined how lattice strain, cation ordering, defects, and interface structure influence magnetic, ferroelectric, and electronic transport properties. Early work in this area includes studies of colossal magnetoresistance in manganites, which explored the role of structural and chemical tuning in magnetotransport phenomena.

Fontcuberta has also contributed to research on multiferroic and magnetoelectric oxides, particularly in epitaxial heterostructures designed to investigate coupling between electric and magnetic order parameters. His collaborative work has included experimental demonstrations of electric‑field effects on magnetic properties in oxide systems.

Another line of research has explored oxide‑based tunnel junctions and spintronic devices. In this area, Fontcuberta has been involved in studies of magnetic and ferroelectric tunnel junctions employing functional oxide barriers, examining their transport behavior and stability. An example is work on multiferroic tunnel junctions, which investigated the coexistence of ferroelectricity and spin‑dependent tunneling in oxide heterostructures.

His research has also included antiferromagnetic and multiferroic materials relevant to emerging memory concepts. Contributions to this field include experimental studies of antiferromagnetic oxide systems operating at room temperature, which have been discussed in relation to alternative approaches to magnetic memory devices.

== Professional service and recognition ==
Fontcuberta has served as an editor of Solid State Communications and as a member of the editorial boards of Advanced Electronic Materials and Journal of Magnetism and Magnetic Materials.

In 2016, he was appointed a Distinguished Lecturer of the IEEE Magnetics Society.

== See also ==
- Magnetism
- Multiferroics
