= Strontium ruthenate =

Strontium ruthenate may refer to two compounds:

- Monostrontium ruthenate, SrRuO_{3}, a ferromagnetic perovskite.
- Distrontium ruthenate, Sr_{2}RuO_{4}, a perovskite superconductor that does not contain copper.
