= Nicola Spaldin =

British scientist

Nicola Spaldin FRS
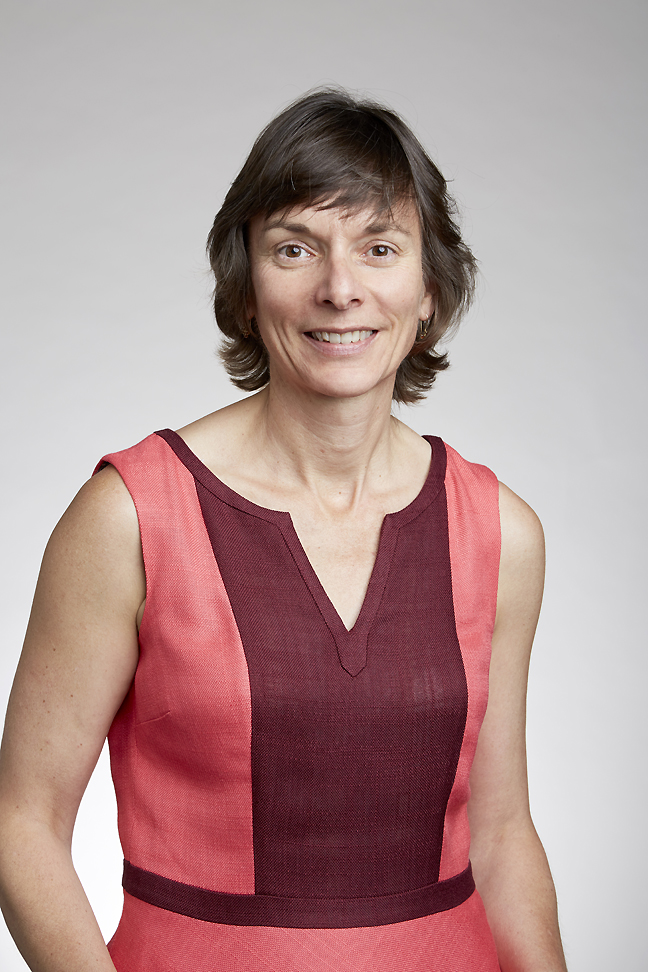
- Nicola Spaldin at the Royal Society admissions day in London, July 2017
- Born: 1969 (age 56–57); Sunderland, UK
- Other name: Nicola A. Hill
- Citizenship: Swiss and UK
- Education: University of Cambridge (BA); University of California, Berkeley (PhD)
- Awards: James C. McGroddy Prize for New Materials (2010); Rössler Prize (2012); Körber European Science Prize (2015); L'Oreal-UNESCO For Women in Science Award (2017); Europhysics Prize (2022); Hamburg Prize for Theoretical Physics (2022); Clarivate Citation in Physics (2026)
- Scientific career
- Fields: Multiferroics; Materials Theory; Strongly Correlated Materials
- Workplaces: ETH Zurich; University of California, Santa Barbara; Yale University
- Thesis: Calculating the electronic properties of semiconductor nanostructures (1996)
- Website: www.theory.mat.ethz.ch/people/person-detail.html?persid=177264

Nicola Ann Spaldin (born 1969) FRS, formerly publishing under the name Nicola A. Hill, is professor of materials science at ETH Zurich, known for her pioneering research on multiferroics.

== Education and early life ==
A native of Sunderland, Tyne and Wear, England, Spaldin earned a Bachelor of Arts degree in natural sciences from the University of Cambridge in 1991, and a PhD in chemistry from the University of California, Berkeley in 1996.

== Career and research ==
Spaldin was inspired to search for multiferroics, magnetic ferroelectric materials, by a remark about potential collaboration made by a colleague studying ferroelectrics during her postdoctoral research studying magnetic phenomena at Yale University from 1996 to 1997. She continued to develop the theory of these materials as a new faculty member at the University of California, Santa Barbara (UCSB), and in 2000 published (under her previous name, Hill) "a seminal article" that for the first time explained why few such materials were known. Following her theoretical predictions, in 2003 she was part of a team that experimentally demonstrated the multiferroic properties of bismuth ferrite, BiFeO_{3}. Over the next years she was involved in a number of developments in the rapidly emerging field of multiferroics, including the first demonstration of electric-field control of magnetism in BiFeO_{3} (selected by Science magazine as one of their "Areas to watch" in their 2007 Breakthroughs of the Year section), the discovery of conducting ferroelectric domain walls and a strain-driven morphotropic phase boundary, again in BiFeO_{3}, and the identification of new mechanisms for multiferroicity, for example the improper geometric ferroelectricity in YMnO_{3}. In the same time period, she developed and implemented methodology to allow application of finite electric and magnetic fields to metal-insulator heterostructures within the density functional theory formalism, allowing her to solve the long-standing problem of the origin of the dielectric dead layer in capacitors and to identify previously unknown routes to magnetoelectric coupling.

Spaldin moved from UCSB to ETH Zurich in 2010. Since then, three particular new directions stand out in her research portfolio. One is the development of the concept and formalism of magnetic multipoles, which require a theory of magnetism beyond the usual magnetic-dipole level. In addition to their importance for magnetoelectric coupling, these have proved relevant for understanding the occurrence of magnetism at the surfaces of compensated antiferromagnets as well as for characterizing phenomena as diverse as altermagnetism and magnetic skyrmions. Second, the establishment of dynamical multiferroicity, which spawned interest in so-called chiral phonons and their associated magnetic moments. And third, the unexpected application of multiferroics in other more fundamental branches of physics: She designed a new multiferroic with the precise specifications required to allow a solid-state search for the electric dipole moment of the electron and identified a multiferroic with a symmetry-lowering phase trainsition that generates the crystallographic equivalent of cosmic strings. These "cross-over" projects led to a current interest in dark-matter direct detection.

Some of her lectures are available on her Youtube channel. She coordinated the revision of her Department's BSc Curriculum in Materials and documented it in a blog.

== Awards and honours ==
Spaldin was the 2010 winner of the American Physical Society's James C. McGroddy Prize for New Materials, the winner of the Rössler Prize of the ETH Zurich Foundation in 2012, the 2015 winner of the Körber European Science Prize for "laying the theoretical foundation for the new family of multiferroic materials" and one of the laureates of the 2017 L'Oréal-UNESCO Awards for Women in Science. In November 2017 she was awarded the Lise-Meitner Lectureship of the Austrian and German Physical Societies in Vienna and in 2019 she won the Swiss Science Prize Marcel Benoist. In 2021 she received the IUPAP Magnetism Award and Néel Medal, and in 2022 the Europhysics Prize of the European Physical Society and the Hamburg Prize for Theoretical Physics. In 2023, she won the Gothenburg Lise Meitner Award.

Spaldin is a Fellow of the American Physical Society (2008), the Materials Research Society (2011), the American Association for the Advancement of Science (2013) and the Royal Society (2017), an Honorary Fellow of Churchill College, Cambridge, and a member of Academia Europaea (2021) and the Swiss Academy of Engineering Sciences (2021). She is a Foreign Associate of the US National Academy of Engineering (2019) and the US National Academy of Sciences, the French Academy of Sciences (2021), the Austrian Academy of Sciences (2022) and the German National Academy of Sciences, Leopoldina (2022). She is an External Scientific Member of the Max Planck Society and a Fellow-Ambassadeur of the CNRS.

In 2026, she was chosen as a Clarivate Citation laureate in Physics, as a possible candidate for the Nobel Prize in Physics "for fundamental theoretical developments leading to the establishment of room-temperature magnetoelectric multiferroics, which are enabling new energy-efficient device paradigms."

Spaldin is a member of the ERC Scientific Council and a founding Lead Editor of Physical Review Research.

Spaldin has twice received the ETH Golden Owl for Teaching Excellence as well as the ETH Award for Best Teaching.

== Textbook ==
Her textbook Magnetic Materials was published by Cambridge University Press in 2010.
