= Sergei V. Kalinin =

Russian materials scientist

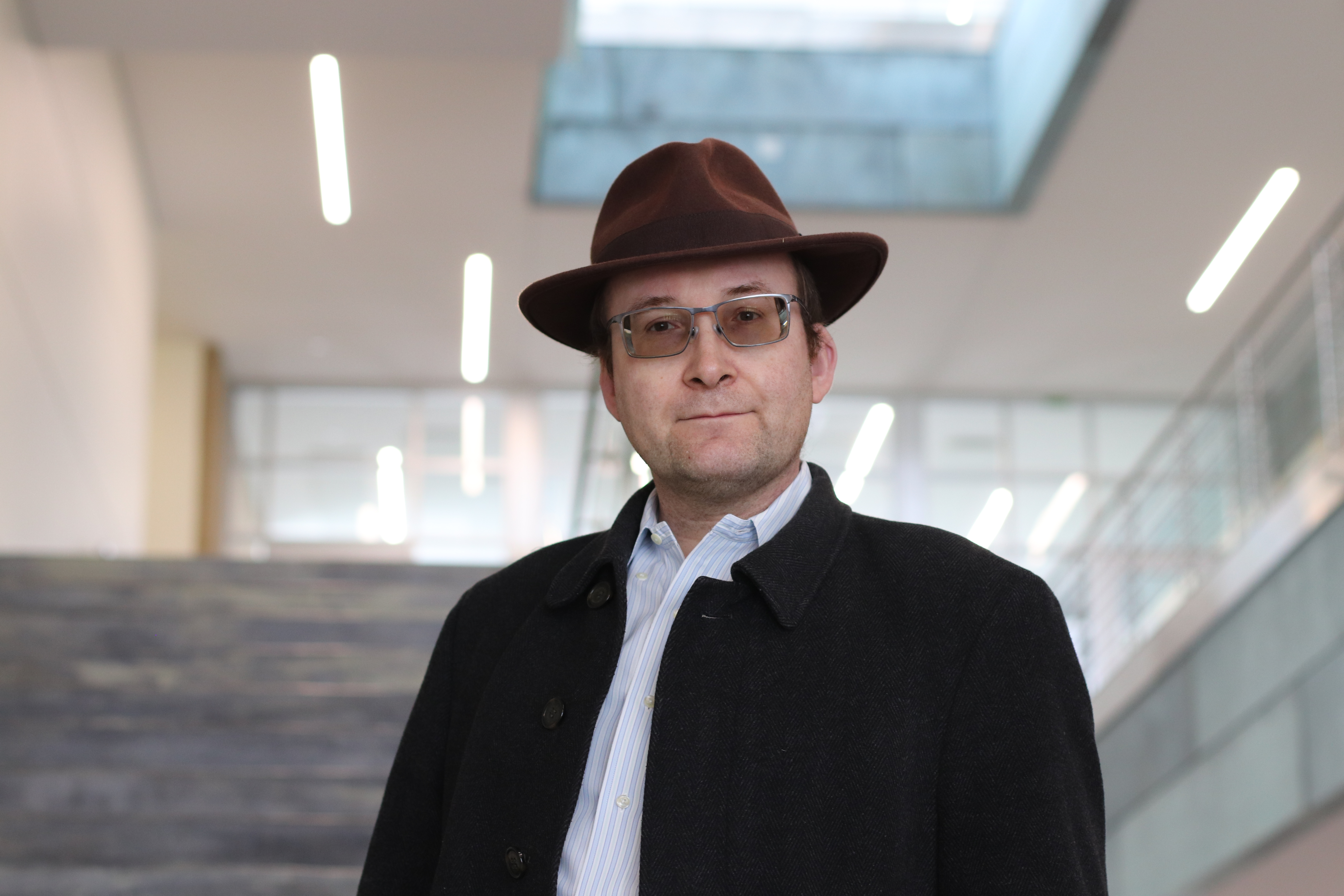
- Born: Sergei Vasilyevich Kalinin; Moscow, Russia
- Education: Moscow State University M.S. (1998); University of Pennsylvania Ph.D. (2002)
- Awards: David Adler Lectureship Award (2025); Peter Duncumb Award (2024); Feynman Prize in Nanotechnology (2022); Blavatnik Award (2018); Royal Microscopical Society medal for Scanning Probe Microscopy (2015); R&D100 Awards (2008, 2010, 2016, 2018, and 2023)
- Scientific career
- Fields: Artificial Intelligence; Big Data; Machine Learning; Atomic Fabrication; Autonomous Experimentation; Scanning Transmission Electron Microscopy; Scanning Probe Microscopy; Piezoresponse Force Microscopy; Nanoscale Electromechanics
- Workplaces: University of Tennessee - Knoxville; Oak Ridge National Laboratory; Pacific Northwest National Laboratory; Amazon
- Thesis: Nanoscale electric phenomena at oxide surfaces and interfaces by scanning probe microscopy (2002)

Sergei Vasilyevich Kalinin is a materials scientist known for pioneering the integration of artificial intelligence, atomic-scale fabrication, and high-resolution microscopy. He is a Chief Scientist for AI/ML in the Physical Sciences at the Pacific Northwest National Laboratory and a Weston Fulton Chair Professor of Materials Science and Engineering at the University of Tennessee-Knoxville. Kalinin is recognized for developing data-driven microscopy methods and for advancing the concept of atom-by-atom manufacturing.

Kalinin co-authored 27 patents, over 800 publications that have been cited over 61,000 times with h-index of 121 (as of Nov 2025). Kalinin’s research sits at the intersection of automation, AI-accelerated discovery, and nanotechnology, making his work influential to emerging innovation sectors including quantum materials, advanced energy systems, and next-generation information technologies.

== Early life and education ==
Kalinin obtained his bachelor's and master's degrees in Materials Science from Moscow State University in 1998. He received his Ph.D. in Materials Science and Engineering from the University of Pennsylvania in 2002 under Prof. Dawn Bonnell. His early academic work focused on ferroelectric materials and scanning probe techniques, laying the foundation for his later contributions to multimodal imaging and data analytics.

== Career ==
=== Oak Ridge National Laboratory ===
Kalinin spent nearly two decades at Oak Ridge National Laboratory (ORNL), where he became a Corporate Fellow and directed the Institute for Functional Imaging of Materials. Kalinin has been a research staff member at ORNL since October 2004. He became a senior member since 2007, a distinguished staff member since 2013, and progressed onto the Corporate Fellow and Group Leader in 2020. He was Theme leader for Electronic and Ionic Functionality at the Center for Nanophase Materials Sciences during 2007–2015 and a recipient of Eugene P. Wigner Fellowship during 2002–2004. His group developed methods combining scanning probe microscopy, electron microscopy, and machine learning to extract physical parameters from large experimental datasets.

=== University of Tennessee, Knoxville ===
Kalinin became Joint faculty at the Center for Interdisciplinary Research and Graduate Education at the University of Tennessee, Knoxville in December 2010. After his assignment at Amazon (see below) he resumed his role at University of Tennessee, Knoxville as the Weston Fulton Chair Professor in the department of Materials Science and Engineering.

His current research is highlighted on his research group website.

=== Industry experience ===
Kalinin has also contributed to industrial R&D, including work in advanced technology development groups in the private sector. His experience spans both large-scale scientific infrastructure and applied research environments, with an emphasis on translating laboratory insights into deployable technologies. From March 2022 to February 2023 Sergei Kalinin worked at Amazon as a principal scientist on special projects.

=== Pacific Northwest National Laboratory ===
At PNNL, Kalinin leads research programs integrating machine learning, automated experiment design, and physical sciences. His work includes the development of closed-loop experimental platforms that enable microscopes to analyze samples and autonomously decide the next step—accelerating materials R&D cycles.

=== Other ===
Kalinin also became adjunct professor at Sung Kyun Kwan University in January 2013.

== Research ==
=== Atom-by-atom fabrication ===
Kalinin's research applies machine learning and artificial intelligence to nanometer scale and atomically resolved imaging data, aiming to extract physics of atomic, molecular, and mesoscale interactions and enable real-time feedback for controlled matter modification, patterning, and atom-by-atom fabrication. The research builds on modern electron and scanning probe microscopies, which provide high-veracity information on the structure and functionalities of solids.

Kalinin has developed frameworks for information capture, crowd-sourced analysis, and physics extraction from imaging tools. His research aims to extract simple physical parameters from imaging data and establish causative relationships between materials properties and functionalities. Kalinin and colleagues believe that electron microscopy can transition from a purely imaging tool to a new paradigm of atomic matter control and quantum computing, enabled via atom by atom fabrication by electron beams.

Kalinin has proposed the concept of Atomic Forge, the use of the sub-atomically focused beam of Scanning Transmission Electron Microscopy for atomic manipulation and atom by atom assembly.

=== AI-Driven microscopy ===
Kalinin is credited with helping establish the field of machine learning–enhanced microscopy, in which algorithms are used to interpret images, infer physical properties, and guide experiments in real time. These tools aim to significantly reduce human intervention and increase throughput in scientific analysis.

He has contributed to frameworks that merge large experimental datasets with physical modeling, enabling predictive understanding of material behavior. His publications explore how AI systems can uncover hidden causal relationships in complex materials.

=== Nanoscale electromechanics ===
Kalinin has contributed to the field of nanoscale electromechanics, exploring the coupling between electrical and mechanical phenomena on the nanoscale. He has made significant contributions to piezoresponse force microscopy (PFM), including the first PFM imaging in liquid and vacuum, PFM of biological tissues, and the observation of nanoscale ferroelectricity in molecular systems.

He has also pioneered the development of spectroscopic imaging modes for PFM, allowing visualization of polarization switching on the sub-10 nanometer level and establishing the resolution and contrast transfer mechanisms of domain walls and spectroscopy. Kalinin led the team that pioneered the BE principle for force-based scanning probe microscopes, enabling quantitative capture of probe-material interactions. His multidimensional, multimodal spectroscopies have enabled quantitative studies of polarization dynamics and mechanical effects accompanying switching in ferroelectrics.

Kalinin's work has revealed the critical role of electrochemical phenomena on ferroelectric surfaces and the emergence of chaos and intermittency during domain switching and shape symmetry breaking. His recent work includes the development of the basic theory and phase-field formulation for domain evolution and the exploration of the coupled electrochemical-ferroelectric states.

== Impact on emerging technologies ==
Kalinin's work is relevant to multiple technology areas:

- Quantum information science: atomic-precision placement of dopants and defects.
- Energy materials: improved characterization of batteries, ionic conductors, and functional oxides.
- Electronics and photonics: patterning and characterization of next-generation devices at atomic resolution.
- AI for science: development of closed-loop, self-driving experimental systems.

His technologies have potential applications in accelerated materials discovery, semiconductor device prototyping, and precision manufacturing, with a potential for attracting interest from organizations investing in scientific automation and atomic-scale engineering.

== Publications and patents ==
Kalinin is the author or co-author of hundreds of peer-reviewed papers and holds multiple patents in scanning probe techniques, data-centric discovery methods, and atomically engineered materials. His work is highly cited across fields such as microscopy, materials characterization, and machine learning for physical sciences.

== Awards and honors ==
Kalinin has received several notable awards in materials science and microscopy, including national-level research awards and distinctions from professional societies in physics, materials research, and surface science. He is a fellow of multiple scientific organizations.

Kalinin's awards and honors include:

- David Adler Lectureship Award for sustained leadership and vision in integrating machine learning methods with physical sciences, particularly in the development of autonomous electron and scanning probe microscopies and applications to nanoscale electromechanics of ferroelectric and energy materials, APS March meeting (2025)
- Peter Duncumb Award for excellence in microanalysis, Microanalysis Society (2024)
- Feynman Prize in Nanotechnology - Experimental category (2022)
- R&D100 Awards (2008, 2010, 2016, 2018, and 2023)
- Blavatnik Award Laureate (2018) and Finalist (2016, 17)
- RMS medal for Scanning Probe Microscopy (2015)
- IEEE-UFFC Ferroelectrics Young Investigator Award in 2010
- Burton Medal of Microscopy Society of America in 2010
- ISIF Young Investigator Award in 2009,
- American Vacuum Society 2008 Peter Mark Memorial Award
- 2003 Ross Coffin Purdy Award and 2009 Robert L. Coble Award for Young Scholars of The American Ceramic Society
- Presidential Early Career Award for Scientists and Engineers (PECASE) in 2009

== Professional service ==
Kalinin serves on editorial boards for leading journals in nanoscience and materials characterization and participates in advisory roles for research programs focused on AI-enabled discovery, electron microscopy innovation, and advanced manufacturing.

He was named a fellow of Royal Society of Chemistry (2024), AAAS (2024), Materials Research Society (2017), Foresight Institute (2017), MRS (2016), AVS (2015), APS (2015), and a senior member (2015) and Fellow (2017) of IEEE.

He is a member of editorial boards for Nanotechnology, Journal of Applied Physics/Applied Physics Letters, and Nature Partner Journal Computational Materials.

== See also ==
- Electron Microscopy
- Quantum Materials
