= Bismuth ferrite =

Identifiers
CAS Number	12010-42-3
3D model (JSmol)	Interactive image
PubChem CID	161118030
- InChI: InChI=1S/Bi.Fe.3O/q2*+3;3*-2 Key: UKOQHRZDRNXQCP-UHFFFAOYSA-N
- SMILES: [Bi+3].[Fe+3].[O-2].[O-2].[O-2]

Properties
Chemical formula	BiFeO_{3}
Molar mass	312.822 g·mol^{−1}
- Except where otherwise noted, data are given for materials in their standard state (at 25 °C [77 °F], 100 kPa). Infobox references

Bismuth ferrite (BiFeO_{3}, also commonly referred to as BFO in materials science) is an inorganic compound with perovskite structure and one of the most promising multiferroic materials. The room-temperature phase of BiFeO_{3} is classed as rhombohedral belonging to the space group R3c. It is synthesized in bulk and thin film form and both its antiferromagnetic (G type ordering) Néel temperature (approximately 653 K) and ferroelectric Curie temperature are well above room temperature (approximately 1100K). Ferroelectric polarization occurs along the pseudocubic direction ($\langle 111\rangle_c$) with a magnitude of 90–95 μC/cm^{2}.

== Sample preparation ==
Bismuth ferrite is not a naturally occurring mineral; several synthesis routes to obtain the compound have been developed.

=== Solid state synthesis ===
In the solid state reaction method bismuth oxide (Bi_{2}O_{3}) and iron(III) oxide (Fe_{2}O_{3}) in a 1:1 mole ratio are mixed with a mortar or by ball milling and then fired at elevated temperatures. Preparation of pure stoichiometric BiFeO_{3} is challenging due to the volatility of bismuth during firing which leads to the formation of stable secondary Bi_{25}FeO_{39} (selenite) and Bi_{2}Fe_{4}O_{9} (mullite) phase. Typically, a firing temperature of 800-880 °C is used for 5 to 60 minutes with rapid subsequent cooling. Excess Bi_{2}O_{3} has also been used a measure to compensate for bismuth volatility and to avoid formation of the Bi_{2}Fe_{4}O_{9} phase.

=== Single crystal growth ===
Bismuth ferrite melts incongruently, but it can be grown from a bismuth oxide rich flux (e.g. a 4:1:1 mixture of Bi_{2}O_{3}, Fe_{2}O_{3} and B_{2}O_{3} at approximately 750-800 °C). High quality single crystals have been important for studying the ferroelectric, antiferromagnetic and magnetoelectric properties of bismuth ferrite.

=== Chemical routes ===
Wet chemical synthesis routes based on sol-gel chemistry, modified Pechini routes, hydrothermal synthesis and precipitation have been used to prepare phase pure BiFeO_{3}. The advantage of the chemical routes is the compositional homogeneity of the precursors and the reduced loss of bismuth due to the much lower temperatures needed. In sol-gel routes, an amorphous precursor is calcined at 300-600 °C to remove organic residuals and to promote crystallization of the bismuth ferrite perovskite phase, while the disadvantage is that the resulting powder must be sintered at high temperature to make a dense polycrystal.

Solution combustion reaction is a low-cost method used to synthesize porous BiFeO_{3}. In this method, a reducing agent (such glycine, citric acid, urea, etc.) and an oxidizing agent (nitrate ions, nitric acid, etc.) are used to generate the reduction-oxidation (redox) reaction. The appearance of the flame, and consequently the temperature of the mixture, depends on the oxidizing/reducing agents ratio used. Annealing up to 600 °C is sometimes needed to decompose the bismuth oxo-nitrates generated as intermediates. Since the content of Fe cations in this semiconductor material, Mӧssbauer spectroscopy is a proper technique to detect the presence of a paramagnetic component in the phase.

=== Thin films ===
The electric and magnetic properties of high quality epitaxial thin films of bismuth ferrite reported in 2003 revived the scientific interest for bismuth ferrite. Epitaxial thin films have the great advantage that their properties can be tuned by processing or chemical doping, and that they can be integrated in electronic circuitry. Epitaxial strain induced by single crystalline substrates with different lattice parameters than bismuth ferrite can be used to modify the crystal structure to monoclinic or tetragonal symmetry and change the ferroelectric, piezoelectric or magnetic properties. Pulsed laser deposition (PLD) is a very common route to epitaxial BiFeO_{3} films, and SrTiO_{3} substrates with SrRuO_{3} electrodes are typically used. Sputtering, molecular-beam epitaxy (MBE), metal organic chemical vapor deposition (MOCVD), atomic layer deposition (ALD), and chemical solution deposition are other methods to prepare epitaxial bismuth ferrite thin films. Apart from its magnetic and electric properties bismuth ferrite also possesses photovoltaic properties which is known as ferroelectric photovoltaic (FPV) effect.

== Applications ==
Being a room temperature multiferroic material and due to its ferroelectric photovoltaic (FPV) effect, bismuth ferrite has several applications in the field of magnetism, spintronics, photovoltaics, etc.

=== Photovoltaics ===
In the FPV effect, a photocurrent is generated in a ferroelectric material under illumination and its direction is dependent upon the ferroelectric polarization of that material. The FPV effect has a promising potential as an alternative to conventional photovoltaic devices. But the main hindrance is that a very small photocurrent is generated in ferroelectric materials like LiNbO_{3}, which is due to its large bandgap and low conductivity. In this direction bismuth ferrite has shown a great potential since a large photocurrent effect and above bandgap voltage is observed in this material under illumination. Most of the works using bismuth ferrite as a photovoltaic material has been reported on its thin film form but in a few reports researchers have formed a bilayer structure with other materials like polymers, graphene and other semiconductors. In a report p-i-n heterojunction has been formed with bismuth ferrite nanoparticles along with two oxide based carrier transporting layers. In spite of such efforts the power conversion efficiency obtained from bismuth ferrite is still very low.

=== Memory chips ===
A team from the Beijing University of Science and Technology and the Spanish National Research Council claim that replacing some of the oxygen of the ferrite with another compound such as sulfur can increase the magnetic force more than 60 times. This may open the possibility to improve magnetic memory density and increase power outage sustainability.

== General references ==
- Varshney, Dinesh; Kumar, Ashwini; Verma, Kavita (2011-08-18). "Effect of A site and B site doping on structural, thermal, and dielectric properties of BiFeO3 ceramics". Journal of Alloys and Compounds. 509 (33): 8421–8426. doi:10.1016/j.jallcom.2011.05.106. ISSN 0925-8388.
