= Ferroelasticity =

Electromagnetic phenomenon

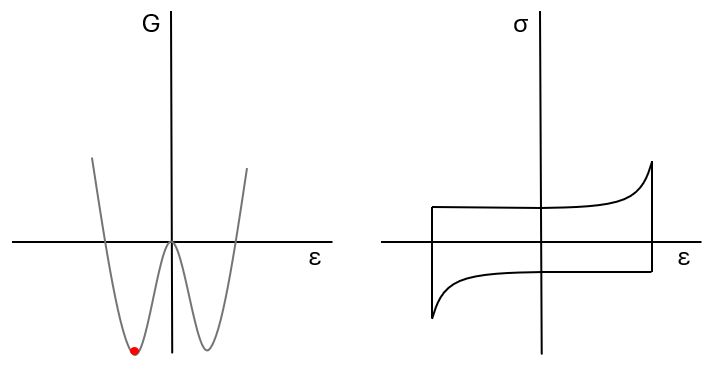
Left: An example free energy given by Landau's theory with two stable states. Transforming between states requires input energy which leads to hysteresis. Right: Example stress-strain hysteresis for a ferroelastic crystal.

Ferroelasticity is a phenomenon in which a material may exhibit a spontaneous strain, and is the mechanical equivalent of ferroelectricity and ferromagnetism in the field of ferroics. A ferroelastic crystal has two or more stable orientational states in the absence of mechanical stress or electric field, i.e. remanent states, and can be reproducibly switched between the states by applying a stress or an electric field greater than some critical value. The application of opposite fields leads to hysteresis as the system crosses back and forth across an energy barrier. This transition dissipates an energy equal to the area enclosed by the hysteresis loop.

The transition of the crystal's parent structure to one of its stable ferroelastic strains is typically accompanied by a reduction in the crystal symmetry. The spontaneous change in strain and crystal structure can be associated with a spontaneous change in other observable properties, such as birefringence, optical absorption, and polarizability. In compatible materials, Raman spectroscopy has been used to directly image ferroelastic switching in crystals.

Landau theory has been used to accurately describe many ferroelastic phase transitions using strain as the Order parameter since nearly all ferroelastic transitions are second order. The free energy is formulated as an expansion in even powers of strain.

The shape memory effect and superelasticity are manifestations of ferroelasticity. Nitinol (nickel titanium), a common ferroelastic alloy, can display either superelasticity or the shape-memory effect at room temperature, depending on the nickel-to-titanium ratio.

Role in Transformation Toughening

Ferroelastic transitions can be used to toughen ceramics with the most notable example being zirconia. A crack propagating through tetragonal zirconia opens up extra space, which allows the region around the crack to transform into the monoclinic phase, expanding as much as 3-4%. This expansion causes a compressive stress ahead of the crack tip, requiring extra work in order to further propagate the crack.

== See also ==
- Ferroics
- Multiferroic
- Flexoelectricity
