= Multiferroics =

Materials which exhibit ferromagnetism, ferroelectricity, and/or ferroelasticity

Multiferroics are defined as materials that exhibit more than one of the primary ferroic properties in the same phase:

- ferromagnetism – a magnetisation that is switchable by an applied magnetic field
- ferroelectricity – an electric polarisation that is switchable by an applied electric field
- ferroelasticity – a deformation that is switchable by an applied stress

While ferroelectrics, ferroelastics, and ferromagnetics are formally multiferroics, these days the term is usually used to describe the magnetoelectric multiferroics that are simultaneously ferromagnetic and ferroelectric. Sometimes the definition is expanded to include nonprimary order parameters, such as antiferromagnetism or ferrimagnetism. In addition, other types of primary order, such as ferroic arrangements of magnetoelectric multipoles of which ferrotoroidicity is an example, were proposed.

Besides scientific interest in their physical properties, multiferroics have potential for applications as actuators, switches, magnetic field sensors and new types of electronic memory devices.

== History ==
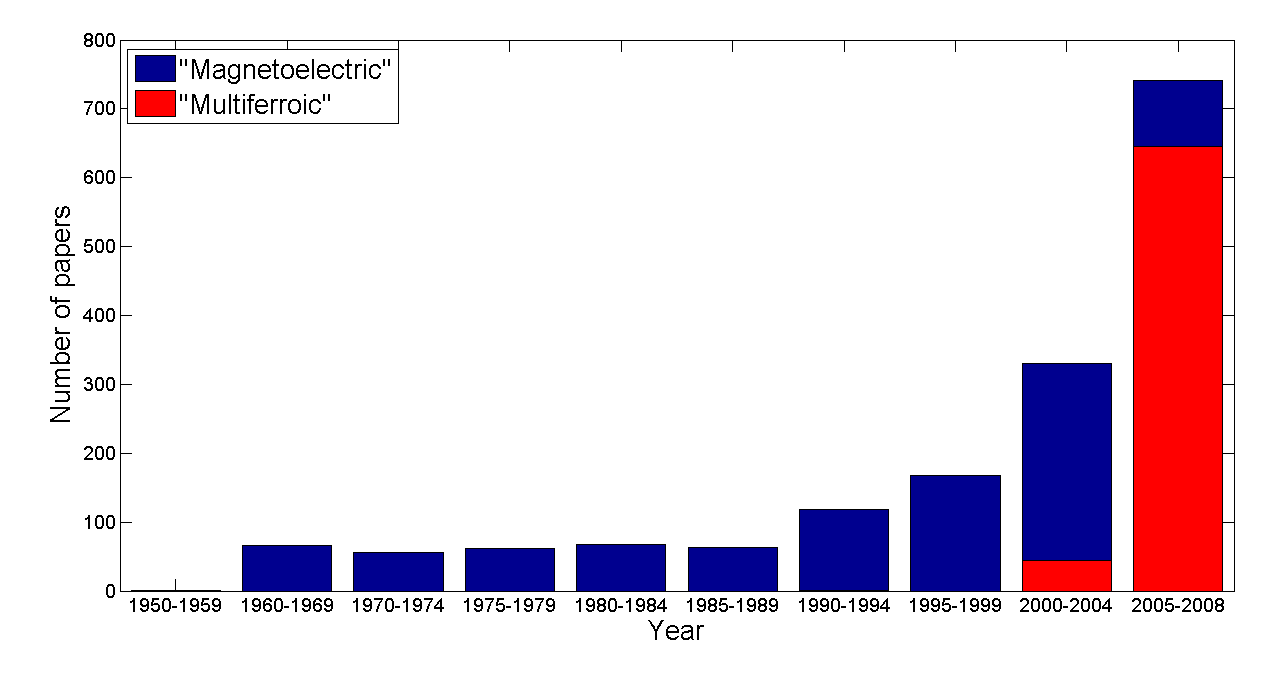
History of multiferroics: number of papers per year on magnetoelectrics or the magnetoelectric effect (in blue), and on multiferroics (in red)

A Web of Science search for the term multiferroic yields the year 2000 paper "Why are there so few magnetic ferroelectrics?" from Nicola Spaldin (then Hill) as the earliest result. This work explained the origin of the contraindication between magnetism and ferroelectricity and proposed practical routes to circumvent it, and is widely credited with starting the modern explosion of interest in multiferroic materials. The availability of practical routes to creating multiferroic materials from 2000 stimulated intense activity. Particularly key early works were the discovery of large ferroelectric polarization in epitaxially grown thin films of magnetic BiFeO_{3}, the observation that the non-collinear magnetic ordering in orthorhombic TbMnO_{3} and TbMn_{2}O_{5} causes ferroelectricity, and the identification of unusual improper ferroelectricity that is compatible with the coexistence of magnetism in hexagonal manganite YMnO_{3}. The graph to the right shows in red the number of papers on multiferroics from a Web of Science search until 2008; the exponential increase continues today.

=== Magnetoelectric materials ===
To place multiferroic materials in their appropriate historical context, one also needs to consider magnetoelectric materials, in which an electric field modifies the magnetic properties and vice versa. While magnetoelectric materials are not necessarily multiferroic, all ferromagnetic ferroelectric multiferroics are linear magnetoelectrics, with an applied electric field inducing a change in magnetization linearly proportional to its magnitude. Magnetoelectric materials and the corresponding magnetoelectric effect have a longer history than multiferroics, shown in blue in the graph to the right. The first known mention of magnetoelectricity is in the 1959 edition of Landau & Lifshitz' Electrodynamics of Continuous Media which has the following comment at the end of the section on piezoelectricity:

Let us point out two more phenomena, which, in principle, could exist. One is piezomagnetism, which consists of linear coupling between a magnetic field in a solid and a deformation (analogous to piezoelectricity). The other is a linear coupling between magnetic and electric fields in a media, which would cause, for example, a magnetization proportional to an electric field. Both these phenomena could exist for certain classes of magnetocrystalline symmetry. We will not however discuss these phenomena in more detail because it seems that till present, presumably, they have not been observed in any substance.

One year later, Igor Dzyaloshinskii showed using symmetry arguments that the material Cr_{2}O_{3} should have linear magnetoelectric behavior, and his prediction was rapidly verified by D. Astrov. Over the next decades, research on magnetoelectric materials continued steadily in a number of groups in Europe, in particular in the former Soviet Union and in the group of Hans Schmid at U. Geneva. A series of East-West conferences entitled Magnetoelectric Interaction Phenomena in Crystals (MEIPIC) was held between 1973 (in Seattle) and 2009 (in Santa Barbara), and indeed the term "multi-ferroic magnetoelectric" was first used by Schmid in the proceedings of the 1993 MEIPIC conference (in Ascona).

== Mechanisms for combining ferroelectricity and magnetism ==
To be defined as ferroelectric, a material must have a spontaneous electric polarization that is switchable by an applied electric field. Usually such an electric polarization arises via an inversion-symmetry-breaking structural distortion from a parent centrosymmetric phase. For example, in the prototypical ferroelectric barium titanate, BaTiO_{3}, the parent phase is the ideal cubic ABO_{3} perovskite structure, with the B-site Ti^{4+} ion at the center of its oxygen coordination octahedron and no electric polarisation. In the ferroelectric phase the Ti^{4+} ion is shifted away from the center of the octahedron causing a polarization. Such a displacement only tends to be favourable when the B-site cation has an electron configuration with an empty d shell (a so-called d^{0} configuration), which favours energy-lowering covalent bond formation between the B-site cation and the neighbouring oxygen anions.

This "d0-ness" requirement is a clear obstacle for the formation of multiferroics, since the magnetism in most transition-metal oxides arises from the presence of partially filled transition metal d shells. As a result, in most multiferroics, the ferroelectricity has a different origin. The following describes the mechanisms that are known to circumvent this contraindication between ferromagnetism and ferroelectricity.

=== Lone-pair-active ===
In lone-pair-active multiferroics, the ferroelectric displacement is driven by the A-site cation, and the magnetism arises from a partially filled d shell on the B site. Examples include bismuth ferrite, BiFeO_{3}, BiMnO_{3} (although this is believed to be anti-polar), and PbVO_{3}. In these materials, the A-site cation (Bi^{3+}, Pb^{2+}) has a so-called stereochemically active 6s^{2} lone-pair of electrons, and off-centering of the A-site cation is favoured by an energy-lowering electron sharing between the formally empty A-site 6p orbitals and the filled O 2p orbitals.

=== Geometric ferroelectricity ===
In geometric ferroelectrics, the driving force for the structural phase transition leading to the polar ferroelectric state is a rotational distortion of the polyhedra rather than an electron-sharing covalent bond formation. Such rotational distortions occur in many transition-metal oxides; in the perovskites for example they are common when the A-site cation is small, so that the oxygen octahedra collapse around it. In perovskites, the three-dimensional connectivity of the polyhedra means that no net polarization results; if one octahedron rotates to the right, its connected neighbor rotates to the left and so on. In layered materials, however, such rotations can lead to a net polarization.

The prototypical geometric ferroelectrics are the layered barium transition metal fluorides, BaMF_{4}, M=Mn, Fe, Co, Ni, Zn, which have a ferroelectric transition at around 1000K and a magnetic transition to an antiferromagnetic state at around 50K. Since the distortion is not driven by a hybridisation between the d-site cation and the anions, it is compatible with the existence of magnetism on the B site, thus allowing for multiferroic behavior.

A second example is provided by the family of hexagonal rare earth manganites (h-RMnO_{3} with R=Ho-Lu, Y), which have a structural phase transition at around 1300 K consisting primarily of a tilting of the MnO_{5} bipyramids. While the tilting itself has zero polarization, it couples to a polar corrugation of the R-ion layers which yields a polarisation of ~6 μC/cm^{2}. Since the ferroelectricity is not the primary order parameter it is described as improper. The multiferroic phase is reached at ~100K when a triangular antiferromagnetic order due to spin frustration arises.

=== Charge ordering ===
Charge ordering can occur in compounds containing ions of mixed valence when the electrons, which are delocalised at high temperature, localize in an ordered pattern on different cation sites so that the material becomes insulating. When the pattern of localized electrons is polar, the charge ordered state is ferroelectric. Usually the ions in such a case are magnetic and so the ferroelectric state is also multiferroic. The first proposed example of a charge ordered multiferroic was LuFe_{2}O_{4}, which charge orders at 330 K with an arrangement of Fe^{2+} and Fe^{3+} ions. Ferrimagnetic ordering occurs below 240 K. Whether or not the charge ordering is polar has recently been questioned, however. In addition, charge ordered ferroelectricity is suggested in magnetite, Fe_{3}O_{4}, below its Verwey transition, and (Pr,Ca)MnO_{3}.

=== Magnetically-driven ferroelectricity ===
In magnetically driven multiferroics the macroscopic electric polarization is induced by long-range magnetic order which is non-centrosymmetric. Formally, the electric polarisation, $\mathbf{P}$, is given in terms of the magnetization, $\mathbf{M}$, by

$\mathbf{P} \sim \mathbf{M} \times (\nabla_{\mathbf{r}} \times \mathbf{M})$.

Like the geometric ferroelectrics discussed above, the ferroelectricity is improper, because the polarisation is not the primary order parameter (in this case the primary order is the magnetisation) for the ferroic phase transition.

The prototypical example is the formation of the non-centrosymmetric magnetic spiral state, accompanied by a small ferroelectric polarization, below 28K in TbMnO_{3}. In this case the polarization is small, 10^{−2} μC/cm^{2}, because the mechanism coupling the non-centrosymmetric spin structure to the crystal lattice is the weak spin-orbit coupling. Larger polarizations occur when the non-centrosymmetric magnetic ordering is caused by the stronger superexchange interaction, such as in orthorhombic HoMnO_{3} and related materials. In both cases the magnetoelectric coupling is strong because the ferroelectricity is directly caused by the magnetic order.

=== f-electron magnetism ===
While most magnetoelectric multiferroics developed to date have conventional transition-metal d-electron magnetism and a novel mechanism for the ferroelectricity, it is also possible to introduce a different type of magnetism into a conventional ferroelectric. The most obvious route is to use a rare-earth ion with a partially filled shell of f electrons on the A site. An example is EuTiO_{3} which, while not ferroelectric under ambient conditions, becomes so when strained a little bit, or when its lattice constant is expanded for example by substituting some barium on the A site.

=== Composites ===
It remains a challenge to develop good single-phase multiferroics with large magnetization and polarization and strong coupling between them at room temperature. Therefore, composites combining magnetic materials, such as FeRh, with ferroelectric materials, such as PMN-PT, are an attractive and established route to achieving multiferroicity. Some examples include magnetic thin films on piezoelectric PMN-PT substrates and Metglass/PVDF/Metglass trilayer structures. Recently a layer-by-layer growth of an atomic-scale multiferroic composite has been demonstrated, consisting of individual layers of ferroelectric and antiferromagnetic LuFeO_{3} alternating with ferrimagnetic but non-polar LuFe_{2}O_{4} in a superlattice.

A new promising approach are core-shell type ceramics where a magnetoelectric composite is formed in-situ during synthesis. In the system (BiFe_{0.9}Co_{0.1}O_{3})_{0.4}-(Bi_{1/2}K_{1/2}TiO_{3})_{0.6} (BFC-BKT) very strong ME coupling has been observed on a microscopic scale using PFM under magnetic field. Furthermore, switching of magnetization via electric field has been observed using MFM. Here, the ME active core-shell grains consist of magnetic CoFe_{2}O_{4} (CFO) cores and a (BiFeO_{3})_{0.6}-(Bi_{1/2}K_{1/2}TiO_{3})_{0.4} (BFO-BKT) shell where core and shell have an epitaxial lattice structure. The mechanism of strong ME coupling is via magnetic exchange interaction between CFO and BFO across the core-shell interface, which results in an exceptionally high Neel-Temperature of 670 K of the BF-BKT phase.

=== Other ===
There have been reports of large magnetoelectric coupling at room-temperature in type-I multiferroics such as in the "diluted" magnetic perovskite (PbZr_{0.53}Ti_{0.47}O_{3})_{0.6}–(PbFe_{1/2}Ta_{1/2}O_{3})_{0.4} (PZTFT) in certain Aurivillius phases. Here, strong ME coupling has been observed on a microscopic scale using PFM under magnetic field among other techniques. Organic-inorganic hybrid multiferroics have been reported in the family of metal-formate perovskites, as well as molecular multiferroics such as [(CH_{3})_{2}NH_{2}][Ni(HCOO)_{3}], with elastic strain-mediated coupling between the order parameters.

== Classification ==
A helpful classification scheme for multiferroics into so-called type-I and type-II multiferroics was introduced in 2009 by D. Khomskii.

Khomskii suggested the term type-I multiferroic for materials in which the ferroelectricity and magnetism occur at different temperatures and arise from different mechanisms. Usually the structural distortion which gives rise to the ferroelectricity occurs at high temperature, and the magnetic ordering, which is usually antiferromagnetic, sets in at lower temperature. The prototypical example is BiFeO_{3} (T_{C}=1100 K, T_{N}=643 K), with the ferroelectricity driven by the stereochemically active lone pair of the Bi^{3+} ion and the magnetic ordering caused by the usual superexchange mechanism. YMnO_{3} (T_{C}=914 K, T_{N}=76 K) is also type-I, although its ferroelectricity is so-called "improper", meaning that it is a secondary effect arising from another (primary) structural distortion. The independent emergence of magnetism and ferroelectricity means that the domains of the two properties can exist independently of each other. Most type-I multiferroics show a linear magnetoelectric response, as well as changes in dielectric susceptibility at the magnetic phase transition.

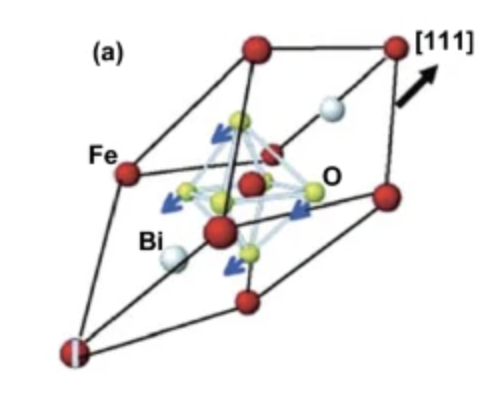
The structure of Bismuth ferrite

The term type-II multiferroic is used for materials in which the magnetic ordering breaks the inversion symmetry and directly "causes" the ferroelectricity. In this case the ordering temperatures for the two phenomena are identical. The prototypical example is TbMnO_{3}, in which a non-centrosymmetric magnetic spiral accompanied by a ferroelectric polarization sets in at 28 K. Since the same transition causes both effects they are by construction strongly coupled. The ferroelectric polarizations tend to be orders of magnitude smaller than those of the type-I multiferroics however, typically of the order of 10^{−2} μC/cm^{2}. The opposite effect has also been reported, in the Mott insulating charge-transfer salt –(BEDT-TTF)2Cu[N(CN)_{2}]Cl. Here, a charge-ordering transition to a polar ferroelectric case drives a magnetic ordering, again giving an intimate coupling between the ferroelectric and, in this case antiferromagnetic, orders.

== Symmetry and coupling ==
The formation of a ferroic order is always associated with the breaking of a symmetry. For example, the symmetry of spatial inversion is broken when ferroelectrics develop their electric dipole moment, and time reversal is broken when ferromagnets become magnetic. The symmetry breaking can be described by an order parameter, the polarization P and magnetization M in these two examples, and leads to multiple equivalent ground states which can be selected by the appropriate conjugate field; electric or magnetic for ferroelectrics or ferromagnets respectively. This leads for example to the familiar switching of magnetic bits using magnetic fields in magnetic data storage.

Ferroics are often characterized by the behavior of their order parameters under space inversion and time reversal (see table). The operation of space inversion reverses the direction of polarisation (so the phenomenon of polarisation is space-inversion antisymmetric) while leaving the magnetisation invariant. As a result, non-polar ferromagnets and ferroelastics are invariant under space inversion whereas polar ferroelectrics are not. The operation of time reversal, on the other hand, changes the sign of M (which is therefore time-reversal antisymmetric), while the sign of P remains invariant. Therefore, non-magnetic ferroelastics and ferroelectrics are invariant under time reversal whereas ferromagnets are not.

	Space-inversion symmetric	Space-inversion antisymmetric
Time-reversal symmetric	Ferroelastic	Ferroelectric
Time-reversal antisymmetric	Ferromagnetic	Magnetoelectric multiferroic

Magnetoelectric multiferroics are both space-inversion and time-reversal anti-symmetric since they are both ferromagnetic and ferroelectric.

The combination of symmetry breakings in multiferroics can lead to coupling between the order parameters, so that one ferroic property can be manipulated with the conjugate field of the other. Ferroelastic ferroelectrics, for example, are piezoelectric, meaning that an electric field can cause a shape change or a pressure can induce a voltage, and ferroelastic ferromagnets show the analogous piezomagnetic behavior. Particularly appealing for potential technologies is the control of the magnetism with an electric field in magnetoelectric multiferroics, since electric fields have lower energy requirements than their magnetic counterparts.

== Applications ==
=== Electric-field control of magnetism ===
The main technological driver for the exploration of multiferroics has been their potential for controlling magnetism using electric fields via their magneto electric coupling. Such a capability could be technologically transformative, since the production of electric fields is far less energy intensive than the production of magnetic fields (which in turn require electric currents) that are used in most existing magnetism-based technologies. There have been successes in controlling the orientation of magnetism using an electric field, for example in heterostructures of conventional ferromagnetic metals and multiferroic BiFeO_{3}, as well as in controlling the magnetic state, for example from antiferromagnetic to ferromagnetic in FeRh.

In multiferroic thin films, the coupled magnetic and ferroelectric order parameters can be exploited for developing magnetoelectronic devices. These include novel spintronic devices such as tunnel magnetoresistance (TMR) sensors and spin valves with electric field tunable functions. A typical TMR device consists of two layers of ferromagnetic materials separated by a thin tunnel barrier (~2 nm) made of a multiferroic thin film. In such a device, spin transport across the barrier can be electrically tuned. In another configuration, a multiferroic layer can be used as the exchange bias pinning layer. If the antiferromagnetic spin orientations in the multiferroic pinning layer can be electrically tuned, then magnetoresistance of the device can be controlled by the applied electric field. One can also explore multiple state memory elements, where data are stored both in the electric and the magnetic polarizations.

=== Radio and high-frequency devices ===
Multiferroic composite structures in bulk form are explored for high-sensitivity ac magnetic field sensors and electrically tunable microwave devices such as filters, oscillators and phase shifters (in which the ferri-, ferro- or antiferro-magnetic resonance is tuned electrically instead of magnetically).

=== Cross-over applications in other areas of physics ===
Multiferroics have been used to address fundamental questions in cosmology and particle physics. In the first, the fact that an individual electron is an ideal multiferroic, with any electric dipole moment required by symmetry to adopt the same axis as its magnetic dipole moment, has been exploited to search for the electric dipole moment of the electron. Using the designed multiferroic material (Eu,Ba)TiO_{3}, the change in net magnetic moment on switching of the ferroelectric polarisation in an applied electric field was monitored, allowing an upper bound on the possible value of the electron electric dipole moment to be extracted. This quantity is important because it reflects the amount of time-reversal (and hence CP) symmetry breaking in the universe, which imposes severe constraints on theories of elementary particle physics. In a second example, the unusual improper geometric ferroelectric phase transition in the hexagonal manganites has been shown to have symmetry characteristics in common with proposed early universe phase transitions. As a result, the hexagonal manganites can be used to run experiments in the laboratory to test various aspects of early universe physics. In particular, a proposed mechanism for cosmic-string formation has been verified, and aspects of cosmic string evolution are being explored through observation of their multiferroic domain intersection analogues.

=== Applications beyond magnetoelectricity ===
A number of other unexpected applications have been identified in the last few years, mostly in multiferroic bismuth ferrite, that do not seem to be directly related to the coupled magnetism and ferroelectricity. These include a photovoltaic effect, photocatalysis, and gas sensing behaviour. It is likely that the combination of ferroelectric polarisation, with the small band gap composed partially of transition-metal d states are responsible for these favourable properties.

Multiferroic films with appropriate band gap structure into solar cells was developed which results in high energy conversion efficiency due to efficient ferroelectric polarization driven carrier separation and overband spacing generation photo-voltage. Various films have been researched, and there is also a new approach to effectively adjust the band gap of the double perovskite multilayer oxide by engineering the cation order for Bi_{2}FeCrO_{6}.

== Dynamics ==
=== Dynamical multiferroicity ===
Recently it was pointed out that, in the same way that electric polarisation can be generated by spatially varying magnetic order, magnetism can be generated by a temporally varying polarisation. The resulting phenomenon was called Dynamical Multiferroicity. The magnetisation, $\mathbf{M}$ is given by

$\mathbf{M} \sim \mathbf{P} \times \frac{\partial \mathbf{P}}{\partial t}$

where $\mathbf{P}$ is the polarisation and the $\times$ indicates the vector product. The dynamical multiferroicity formalism underlies the following diverse range of phenomena:

- The phonon Zeeman effect, in which phonons of opposite circular polarisation have different energies in a magnetic field. This phenomenon awaits experimental verification.
- Resonant magnon excitation by optical driven phonons.
- Dzylaoshinskii-Moriya-type electromagnons.
- The inverse Faraday effect.
- Exotic flavours of quantum criticality.

=== Dynamical processes ===
The study of dynamics in multiferroic systems is concerned with understanding the time evolution of the coupling between various ferroic orders, in particular under external applied fields. Current research in this field is motivated both by the promise of new types of application reliant on the coupled nature of the dynamics, and the search for new physics lying at the heart of the fundamental understanding of the elementary MF excitations. An increasing number of studies of MF dynamics are concerned with the coupling between electric and magnetic order parameters in the magnetoelectric multiferroics. In this class of materials, the leading research is exploring, both theoretically and experimentally, the fundamental limits (e.g. intrinsic coupling velocity, coupling strength, materials synthesis) of the dynamical magnetoelectric coupling and how these may be both reached and exploited for the development of new technologies.

At the heart of the proposed technologies based on magnetoelectric coupling are switching processes, which describe the manipulation of the material's macroscopic magnetic properties with electric field and vice versa. Much of the physics of these processes is described by the dynamics of domains and domain walls. An important goal of current research is the minimization of the switching time, from fractions of a second ("quasi"-static regime), towards the nanosecond range and faster, the latter being the typical time scale needed for modern electronics, such as next generation memory devices.

Ultrafast processes operating at picosecond, femtosecond, and even attosecond scale are both driven by, and studied using, optical methods that are at the front line of modern science. The physics underpinning the observations at these short time scales is governed by non-equilibrium dynamics, and usually makes use of resonant processes. One demonstration of ultrafast processes is the switching from collinear antiferromagnetic state to spiral antiferromagnetic state in CuO under excitation by 40 fs 800 nm laser pulse. A second example shows the possibility for the direct control of spin waves with THz radiation on antiferromagnetic NiO. These are promising demonstrations of how the switching of electric and magnetic properties in multiferroics, mediated by the mixed character of the magnetoelectric dynamics, may lead to ultrafast data processing, communication and quantum computing devices.

Current research into MF dynamics aims to address various open questions; the practical realisation and demonstration of ultra-high speed domain switching, the development of further new applications based on tunable dynamics, e.g. frequency dependence of dielectric properties, the fundamental understanding of the mixed character of the excitations (e.g. in the ME case, mixed phonon-magnon modes – 'electromagnons'), and the potential discovery of new physics associated with the MF coupling.

== Domains and domain walls ==
Schematic picture of the four possible domain states of a ferroelectric ferromagnetic material in which both the polarization (electric dipole indicated by charges) and the magnetization (red arrow) have two opposite orientations. The domains are separated by different types of domain walls, classified by the order parameters that change across the wall.

Like any ferroic material, a multiferroic system is fragmented into domains. A domain is a spatially extended region with a constant direction and phase of its order parameters. Neighbouring domains are separated by transition regions called domain walls.

=== Properties of multiferroic domains ===
In contrast to materials with a single ferroic order, domains in multiferroics have additional properties and functionalities. For instance, they are characterized by an assembly of at least two order parameters. The order parameters may be independent (typical yet not mandatory for a Type-I multiferroic) or coupled (mandatory for a Type-II multiferroic).

Many outstanding properties that distinguish domains in multiferroics from those in materials with a single ferroic order are consequences of the coupling between the order parameters.

- The coupling can lead to patterns with a distribution and/or topology of domains that is exclusive to multiferroics.
- The order-parameter coupling is usually homogeneous across a domain, i.e., gradient effects are negligible.
- In some cases the averaged net value of the order parameter for a domain pattern is more relevant for the coupling than the value of the order parameter of an individual domain.

These issues lead to novel functionalities which explain the current interest in these materials.

=== Properties of multiferroic domain walls ===
Domain walls are spatially extended regions of transition mediating the transfer of the order parameter from one domain to another. In comparison to the domains the domain walls are not homogeneous and they can have a lower symmetry. This may modify the properties of a multiferroic and the coupling of its order parameters leading to inhomogeneous magnetoelectric effect. Multiferroic domain walls may display particular static and dynamic properties.

Static properties refer to stationary walls. They can result from

- The reduced dimensionality
- The finite width of the wall
- The different symmetry of the wall
- The inherent chemical, electronic, or order-parameter inhomogeneity within the walls and the resulting gradient effects.

== Synthesis ==
Multiferroic properties can appear in a large variety of materials. Therefore, several conventional material fabrication routes are used, including solid state synthesis, hydrothermal synthesis, sol-gel processing, vacuum based deposition, and floating zone.

Some types of multiferroics require more specialized processing techniques, such as

- Vacuum based deposition (for instance: MBE, PLD) for thin film deposition to exploit certain advantages that may come with 2-dimensional layered structures such as: strain mediated multiferroics, heterostructures, anisotropy.
- High pressure solid state synthesis to stabilize metastable or highly distorted structures, or in the case of the Bi-based multiferroics due to the high volatility of bismuth.

== List of materials ==
Most multiferroic materials identified to date are transition-metal oxides, which are compounds made of (usually 3d) transition metals with oxygen and often an additional main-group cation. Transition-metal oxides are a favorable class of materials for identifying multiferroics for a few reasons:

- The localised 3d electrons on the transition metal are usually magnetic if they are partially filled with electrons.
- Oxygen is at a "sweet spot" in the periodic table in that the bonds it makes with transition metals are neither too ionic (like its neighbor fluorine, F) or too covalent (like its neighbor nitrogen, N). As a result, its bonds with transition metals are rather polarizable, which is favorable for ferroelectricity.
- Transition metals and oxygen tend to be earth abundant, non-toxic, stable and environmentally benign.

Many multiferroics have the perovskite structure. This is in part historical – most of the well-studied ferroelectrics are perovskites – and in part because of the high chemical versatility of the structure.

Below is a list of some the most well-studied multiferroics with their ferroelectric and magnetic ordering temperatures. When a material shows more than one ferroelectric or magnetic phase transition, the most relevant for the multiferroic behavior is given.

critical temperature
Material	Ferroelectric T_{C} [K]	magnetic T_{N} or T_{C} [K]	Type of ferroelectricity
BiFeO_{3}	1100	653	lone pair
h-YMnO_{3}	920	80	geometric (improper)
BaNiF_{4}			geometric (proper)
PbVO_{3}			lone pair
BiMnO_{3}			lone pair
LuFe_{2}O_{4}			charge ordered
HoMn_{2}O_{5}	39		magnetically driven
h-HoMnO_{3}	873	76	geometric (improper)
h-ScMnO_{3}		129	geometric (improper)
h-ErMnO_{3}	833	80	geometric (improper)
h-TmMnO_{3}	>573	86	geometric (improper)
h-YbMnO_{3}	993	87	geometric (improper)
h-LuMnO_{3}	>750	96	geometric (improper)
K_{2}SeO_{4}			geometric
Cs_{2}CdI_{4}			geometric
TbMnO_{3}	27	42	magnetically driven
Ni_{3}V_{2}O_{8}	6.5		
MnWO_{4}	13.5		magnetically driven
CuO	230	230	magnetically driven
ZnCr_{2}Se_{4}	110	20	
LiCu_{2}O_{2}			
Ni_{3}B_{7}O_{13}I			

== See also ==
- Ferrotoroidicity

== Reviews on Multiferroics ==
- Spaldin, Nicola A. (2020). "Multiferroics beyond electric-field control of magnetism". Proc. R. Soc. A. 476 (2233): 0542. arXiv:1908.08352. Bibcode:2020RSPSA.47690542S. doi:10.1098/rspa.2019.0542. PMC 7016559. PMID 32082059.
- Spaldin, N. A.; Ramesh, R. (2019). "Advances in magnetoelectric multiferroics". Nature. 18 (3): 203–212. Bibcode:2019NatMa..18..203S. doi:10.1038/s41563-018-0275-2. hdl:20.500.11850/328405. PMID 30783227. S2CID 73464831.
- Spaldin, Nicola A. (2017). "Multiferroics: Past, present, and future". MRS Bulletin. 42 (5): 385–390. Bibcode:2017MRSBu..42..385S. doi:10.1557/mrs.2017.86. hdl:20.500.11850/190313. ISSN 0883-7694.
- Spaldin, Nicola A. (2017). "Multiferroics: from the cosmically large to the subatomically small". Nature Reviews Materials. 2 (5) 17017. Bibcode:2017NatRM...217017S. doi:10.1038/natrevmats.2017.17.
- Fiebig, M.; Lottermoser, Th.; Meier, D.; Trassin, M. (2016). "The evolution of multiferroics". Nature Reviews Materials. 1 (8): 16046. Bibcode:2016NatRM...116046F. doi:10.1038/natrevmats.2016.46.
- Dong, S.; Liu, J.-M.; Cheong, S.-W.; Ren, Z.F. (2015). "Multiferroic materials and magnetoelectric physics: symmetry, entanglement, excitation, and topology". Advances in Physics. 64 (5–6): 519–626. arXiv:1512.05372. Bibcode:2015AdPhy..64..519D. doi:10.1080/00018732.2015.1114338. S2CID 119182615.
- Pyatakov, A. P.; Zvezdin, A. K. (2012). "Magnetoelectric and multiferroic media". Physics-Uspekhi. 55 (6): 557–581. Bibcode:2012PhyU...55..557P. doi:10.3367/ufne.0182.201206b.0593. S2CID 122494737.
- Ma, J.; Hu, J. M.; Li, Z.; Nan, C. W. (2011). "Recent progress in multiferroic magnetoelectric composites: from bulk to thin films". Advanced Materials. 23 (9): 1062–1087. Bibcode:2011AdM....23.1062M. doi:10.1002/adma.201003636. PMID 21294169. S2CID 21959561.
- Akbashev, A. R.; Kaul, A. R. (2011). "Structural and chemical aspects of the design of multiferroic materials". Russian Chemical Reviews. 80 (12): 1159–1177. Bibcode:2011RuCRv..80.1159A. doi:10.1070/rc2011v080n12abeh004239. S2CID 96269424.
- Tokura, Y.; Seki, S. (2010). "Multiferroics with Spiral Spin Orders". Adv. Mater. 22 (14): 1554–1565. Bibcode:2010AdM....22.1554T. doi:10.1002/adma.200901961. PMID 20496385. S2CID 12517975.
- Spaldin, Nicola A.; Cheong, Sang-Wook; Ramesh, Ramamoorthy (2010-10-01). "Multiferroics: Past, present, and future". Physics Today. 63 (10): 38–43. Bibcode:2010PhT....63j..38S. doi:10.1063/1.3502547. hdl:20.500.11850/190313. S2CID 36755212.
- Wang, K. F.; Liu, J. M.; Ren, Z. F. (2009). "Multiferroicity: the coupling between magnetic and polarization orders". Adv. Phys. 58 (4): 321–448. arXiv:0908.0662. Bibcode:2009AdPhy..58..321W. doi:10.1080/00018730902920554. S2CID 118149803.
- Khomskii, D. (2008). "Multiferroicity due to charge ordering". Journal of Physics: Condensed Matter. 20 (43) 434217. arXiv:0803.2964. Bibcode:2008JPCM...20Q4217V. doi:10.1088/0953-8984/20/43/434217. S2CID 1037678.
- Nan, Ce-Wen; Bichurin, M. I.; Dong, Shuxiang; Viehland, D.; Srinivasan, G. (2008). "Multiferroic magnetoelectric composites: Historical perspective, status and future directions". J. Appl. Phys. 103 (3): 031101–031101–35. Bibcode:2008JAP...103c1101N. doi:10.1063/1.2836410. S2CID 51900508.
- Spaldin, Nicola A.; Ramesh, R. (2008-11-01). "Electric-Field Control of Magnetism in Complex Oxide Thin Films". MRS Bulletin. 33 (11): 1047–1050. doi:10.1557/mrs2008.224. ISSN 1938-1425.
- Kimura, T. (2007). "Spiral magnets as Magnetoelectrics". Annu. Rev. Mater. Res. 37: 387–413. Bibcode:2007AnRMS..37..387K. doi:10.1146/annurev.matsci.37.052506.084259.
- Bibes, M.; Barthelemy, A. (2007). "Oxide spintronics". IEEE Trans. Electron Devices. 54 (5): 1003–1023. arXiv:0706.3015. Bibcode:2007ITED...54.1003B. doi:10.1109/ted.2007.894366. S2CID 8544618.
- Cheong, S.-W.; Mostovoy, M. (2007). "Multiferroics: a magnetic twist for ferroelectricity" (PDF). Nature Materials. 6 (1): 13–20. Bibcode:2007NatMa...6...13C. doi:10.1038/nmat1804. hdl:11370/f0777dfc-d0d7-4358-8337-c63e7ad007e7. PMID 17199121. S2CID 23304200.
- Ramesh, R.; Spaldin, N. A. (2007). "Multiferroics: progress and prospects in thin films". Nature Materials. 6 (1): 21–29. Bibcode:2007NatMa...6...21R. doi:10.1038/nmat1805. PMID 17199122.
- Tokura, Y. (2007). "Multiferroics – toward strong coupling between magnetization and polarization in a solid". J. Mag. Mag. Mat. 310 (2): 1145–1150. Bibcode:2007JMMM..310.1145T. doi:10.1016/j.jmmm.2006.11.198.
- Rao, C. N. R.; Serrao, C. R. (2007). "New routes to multiferroics". J. Mater. Chem. 17 (47): 4931. doi:10.1039/b709126e.
- Eerenstein, W.; Mathur, N. D.; Scott, J. F. (2006). "Multiferroic and magnetoelectric materials'". Nature. 442 (7104): 759–765. Bibcode:2006Natur.442..759E. doi:10.1038/nature05023. PMID 16915279. S2CID 4387694.
- Khomskii, D. I. (2006). "Multiferroics: Different ways to combine magnetism and ferroelectricity". J. Mag. Mag. Mat. 306 (1): 1. arXiv:cond-mat/0601696. Bibcode:2006JMMM..306....1K. doi:10.1016/j.jmmm.2006.01.238. S2CID 119377961.
- Tokura, Y. (2006). "Multiferroics as Quantum Electromagnets'". Science. 312 (5779): 1481–1482. doi:10.1126/science.1125227. PMID 16763137. S2CID 136576668.
- Prellier, W.; Singh, M. P.; Murugavel, P. (2005). "The single-phase multiferroic oxides: from bulk to thin film". J. Phys.: Condens. Matter. 17 (30): R803. Bibcode:2005JPCM...17R.803P. doi:10.1088/0953-8984/17/30/r01. S2CID 115951362.
- Fiebig, M. (2005). "Revival of the magnetoelectric effect". J. Phys. D: Appl. Phys. 38 (8): R123. Bibcode:2005JPhD...38R.123F. doi:10.1088/0022-3727/38/8/r01. S2CID 121588385.
- Spaldin, N. A.; Fiebig, M. (2005). "The Renaissance of Magnetoelectric Multiferroics". Science. 309 (5733): 391–392. doi:10.1126/science.1113357. PMID 16020720. S2CID 118513837.

== Talks and documentaries on multiferroics ==
France 24 documentary "Nicola Spaldin: The pioneer behind multiferroics" (12 minutes) Nicola Spaldin: The pioneer behind multiferroics

Seminar "Electric field control of magnetism" by R. Ramesh at U Michigan (1 hour) Ramamoorthy Ramesh | Electric Field Control of Magnetism

Max Roessler prize for multiferroics at ETH Zürich (5 minutes): Nicola Spaldin, Professor of Materials Theory at ETH Zurich

ICTP Colloquium "From materials to cosmology; Studying the early universe under the microscope" by Nicola Spaldin (1 hour) From Materials to Cosmology: Studying the early universe under the microscope - ICTP COLLOQUIUM

Tsuyoshi Kimura's research on "Toward highly functional devices using mulitferroics" (4 minutes): Toward highly functional devices using multi-ferroics

"Strong correlation between electricity and magnetism in materials" by Yoshi Tokura (45 minutes): 4th Kyoto Prize Symposium [Materials Science and Engineering] Yoshinori Tokura, July 2, 2017

"Breaking the wall to the next material age", Falling Walls, Berlin (15 minutes): How Materials Science Heralds a New Class of Technologies | NICOLA SPALDIN
