= Institute for Functional Imaging of Materials =

American organization

The Institute for Functional Imaging of Materials (IFIM) is an organization set up in 2014, within the Oak Ridge National Laboratory (ORNL) situated in Oak Ridge, Tennessee, USA. The goal of the institute is to provide a bridge between modeling and applied mathematics and imaging data collected from various forms of microscopy available at ORNL. The current director of the IFIM is Sergei Kalinin who was awarded the Medal for Scanning Probe Microscopy by the Royal Microscopical Society. The institute supports President Obama's Materials Genome Initiative.

The IFIM research effort centers at: - development of new imaging modes for electron and scanning probe microscopy and chemical imaging, including full information capture, retention, and analysis - physics-based image analysis from image library creation to structure-property relationship mining to physics extraction - active feedback during imaging, including electron beam atom by atom fabrication (Atomic Forge)
