= Ferroics =

Study of ferromagnetism and its effects within materials

In physics, ferroics is the study of ferromagnets, ferroelectrics, and ferroelastics.

== Phase transitions ==
The basis of ferroics is to understand large changes in physical characteristics that can occur over a narrow temperature range. Changes in physical characteristics occur when phase transitions take place around some critical temperature value, normally denoted by $T_c$. Above this critical temperature, the crystal is in a nonferroic state and does not exhibit ferroic characteristics. Falling below $T_c$ it undergoes a spontaneous phase transition. Such a transition typically results in a small deviation from the nonferroic crystal structure, but with a different shape of the unit cell, the point symmetry of the material is reduced. This breaking of symmetry allows the formation of the ferroic phase.

Lowering the temperature below $T_c$ includes a spontaneous dipole moment along an axis of the unit cell. Although individual dipole moments can sometimes be small, the effect of $10^{24}$ unit cells gives rise to a significant electric field.

Ferroelectrics cannot exist in a centrosymmetric crystal. A centrosymmetric crystal is one where lattice point $\left (x,y,z \right )$ can be mapped onto lattice point $\left ( -x,-y,-z \right )$.

The spontaneous magnetization of a ferromagnet can be attributed to a breaking of point symmetry in switching from the paramagnetic to the ferromagnetic phase. In this case, $T_c$ is known as the Curie temperature.

In ferroelastic crystals, in going from the nonferroic (or prototypic phase) to the ferroic phase, a spontaneous strain is induced. An example of a ferroelastic phase transition is when the crystal structure spontaneously changes from a tetragonal structure (a square prism shape) to a monoclinic structure (a general parallelepiped). Here the shapes of the unit cell before and after the phase transition are different, inducing a strain within the material.

== Variants ==
Multiferroic materials exhibit more than one ferroic property simultaneously in a single phase.

A fourth ferroic order termed ferrotoroidic order has been proposed.

Many ferroic phase transitions have been studied under non-equilibrium conditions. Under energy disspative condition, quantum system or event colloid particles may shows ferrioic-like order which can be regarded as a nonequilibrium analogue to ferroic material. For example, chemically reactive colloidal particles have been observed to exhibit criticality and long-range order, collectively referred to as ferrochemical order.

== See also ==
- Piezoelectricity
- Pyroelectricity
