= Magnetoelectric effect =

Coupling between the magnetic and the electric properties of a material

In its most general form, the magnetoelectric effect (ME) denotes any coupling between the magnetic and the electric properties of a material. The first example of such an effect was described by Wilhelm Röntgen in 1888, who found that a dielectric material moving through an electric field would become magnetized. A material where such a coupling is intrinsically present is called a magnetoelectric.

Some promising applications of the ME effect are sensitive detection of magnetic fields, advanced logic devices and tunable microwave filters.

== History ==
The first example of a magnetoelectric effect was discussed in 1888 by Wilhelm Röntgen, who showed that a dielectric material moving through an electric field would become magnetized. The possibility of an intrinsic magnetoelectric effect in a (non-moving) material was conjectured by Pierre Curie in 1894, while the term "magnetoelectric" was coined by Peter Debye in 1926. A mathematical formulation of the linear magnetoelectric effect was included in Lev Landau and Evgeny Lifshitz's Course of Theoretical Physics. Only in 1959 did Igor Dzyaloshinskii, using an elegant symmetry argument, derive the form of a linear magnetoelectric coupling in chromium(III) oxide (Cr_{2}O_{3}). The experimental confirmation came just a few months later when the effect was observed for the first time by D. Astrov. The general excitement which followed the measurement of the linear magnetoelectric effect lead to the organization of the series of Magnetoelectric Interaction Phenomena in Crystals (MEIPIC) conferences. Between the prediction of Dzyaloshinskii and the MEIPIC first edition (1973), more than 80 linear magnetoelectric compounds were found. Recently, technological and theoretical progress, driven in large part by the advent of multiferroic materials, triggered a renaissance of these studies and magnetoelectric effect is still heavily investigated.

== Linear magnetoelectric effect ==
Historically, the first and most studied example of this effect is the linear magnetoelectric effect. Mathematically, while the electric susceptibility $\chi^e$ and magnetic susceptibility $\chi^v$ describe the electric and magnetic polarization responses to an electric, resp. a magnetic field, there is also the possibility of a magnetoelectric susceptibility $\alpha_{ij}$ which describes a linear response of the electric polarization to a magnetic field, and vice versa:

$$P_i= \sum_j \epsilon_0\chi^e_{ij} E_{j} + \sum_j \alpha_{ij}H_j$$
$$\mu_0 M_i= \sum_j \mu_0\chi^v_{ij}H_{j} + \sum_j \alpha_{ij}E_j,$$

The tensor $\alpha$ must be the same in both equations. Here, P is the electric polarization, M the magnetization, E and H the electric and magnetic fields. In SI units, $\alpha$ has units of second per meter.

The first material where an intrinsic linear magnetoelectric effect was predicted theoretically and confirmed experimentally was Cr_{2}O_{3}. This is a single-phase material. Multiferroics are another example of single-phase materials that can exhibit a general magnetoelectric effect if their magnetic and electric orders are coupled. Composite materials are another way to realize magnetoelectrics. There, the idea is to combine, say a magnetostrictive and a piezoelectric material. These two materials interact by strain, leading to a coupling between magnetic and electric properties of the compound material.

== General phenomenology ==
If the coupling between magnetic and electric properties is analytic, then the magnetoelectric effect can be described by an expansion of the free energy as a power series in the electric and magnetic fields $E$ and $H$:

$$\begin{align}
F(E,H) &= F_0 - P^{s}_i E_i - \mu_0 M^{s}_i H_i
- \frac12 \epsilon_0 \chi^e_{ij} E_i E_j - \frac12 \mu_0 \chi^v_{ij} H_i H_j
\\ &\qquad
- \alpha_{ij} E_i H_j
-\frac12 \beta_{ijk} E_i H_j H_k -\frac12 \gamma_{ijk}H_i E_j E_k + \ldots
\end{align}$$

Differentiating the free energy will then give the electric polarization $P_i = -\frac{\partial F}{\partial E_i}$ and the magnetization $M_i = -\frac{1}{\mu_0} \frac{\partial F}{\partial H_i}$. Here, $P^{s}$ and $M^{s}$ are the static polarization, resp. magnetization of the material, whereas $\chi^e$ and $\chi^v$ are the electric, resp. magnetic susceptibilities. The tensor $\alpha$ describes the linear magnetoelectric effect, which corresponds to an electric polarization induced linearly by a magnetic field, and vice versa. The higher terms with coefficients $\beta$ and $\gamma$ describe quadratic effects. For instance, the tensor $\gamma$ describes a linear magnetoelectric effect which is, in turn, induced by an electric field.

The possible terms appearing in the expansion above are constrained by symmetries of the material. Most notably, the tensor $\alpha$ must be antisymmetric under time-reversal symmetry. Therefore, the linear magnetoelectric effect may only occur if time-reversal symmetry is explicitly broken, for instance by the explicit motion in Röntgens' example, or by an intrinsic magnetic ordering in the material. In contrast, the tensor $\beta$ may be non-vanishing in time-reversal symmetric materials.

== Microscopic origin ==
There are several ways in which a magnetoelectric effect can arise microscopically in a material.

=== Single-ion anisotropy ===
In crystals, spin–orbit coupling is responsible for single-ion magnetocrystalline anisotropy which determines preferential axes for the orientation of the spins (such as easy axes). An external electric field may change the local symmetry seen by magnetic ions and affect both the strength of the anisotropy and the direction of the easy axes. Thus, single-ion anisotropy can couple an external electric field to spins of magnetically ordered compounds.

=== Symmetric Exchange striction ===
The main interaction between spins of transition metal ions in solids is usually provided by superexchange, also called symmetric exchange. This interaction depends on details of the crystal structure such as the bond length between magnetic ions and the angle formed by the bonds between magnetic and ligand ions. In magnetic insulators it usually is the main mechanism for magnetic ordering, and, depending on the orbital occupancies and bond angles, can lead to ferro- or antiferromagnetic interactions. As the strength of symmetric exchange depends on the relative position of the ions, it couples the spin orientations to the lattice structure. Coupling of spins to a collective distortion with a net electric dipole can occur if the magnetic order breaks inversion symmetry. Thus, symmetric exchange can provide a handle to control magnetic properties through an external electric field.

=== Strain driven magnetoelectric heterostructured effect ===
Because materials exist that couple strain to electrical polarization (piezoelectrics, electrostrictives, and ferroelectrics) and that couple strain to magnetization (magnetostrictive/magnetoelastic/ferromagnetic materials), it is possible to couple magnetic and electric properties indirectly by creating composites of these materials that are tightly bonded so that strains transfer from one to the other.

Thin film strategy enables achievement of interfacial multiferroic coupling through a mechanical channel in heterostructures consisting of a magnetoelastic and a piezoelectric component. This type of heterostructure is composed of an epitaxial magnetoelastic thin film grown on a piezoelectric substrate. For this system, application of a magnetic field will induce a change in the dimension of the magnetoelastic film. This process, called magnetostriction, will alter residual strain conditions in the magnetoelastic film, which can be transferred through the interface to the piezoelectric substrate. Consequently, a polarization is introduced in the substrate through the piezoelectric process.

The overall effect is that the polarization of the ferroelectric substrate is manipulated by an application of a magnetic field, which is the desired magnetoelectric effect (the reverse is also possible). In this case, the interface plays an important role in mediating the responses from one component to another, realizing the magnetoelectric coupling. For an efficient coupling, a high-quality interface with optimal strain state is desired. In light of this interest, advanced deposition techniques have been applied to synthesize these types of thin film heterostructures. Molecular beam epitaxy has been demonstrated to be capable of depositing structures consisting of piezoelectric and magnetostrictive components. Materials systems studied included cobalt ferrite, magnetite, SrTiO_{3}, BaTiO_{3}, PMNT.

=== Flexomagnetoelectric effect ===
Magnetically driven ferroelectricity is also caused by inhomogeneous magnetoelectric interaction. This effect appears due to the coupling between inhomogeneous order parameters. It was also called as flexomagnetoelectric effect. Usually it is describing using the Lifshitz invariant (i.e. single-constant coupling term):

$F_{FME}=\gamma_0 \bold{P}\biggl(\bold{M}(\nabla\bold{M})-(\bold{M}\nabla)\bold{M}\biggr)$,

where $\gamma_0$ is a constant of flexomagnetoelectric interaction in a cubic hexoctahedral crystal. This free energy term is valid in the case of variational problem with the unknown $\bold{M}(\bold{r})$. It was shown that in general case of cubic $m\bar{3}m$ crystal the four-phenomenological constants approach is correct:

$F_{FME}=\gamma_1 P_i \nabla_i M_i^2 + \gamma_2 \Bigl(\bold{P}\nabla\Bigr)\bold{M}^2+\gamma_3 \bold{P}\Bigl(\bold{M}\nabla\Bigr)\bold{M}+\gamma_4\Bigl(\bold{P}\bold{M}\Bigr)\nabla\bold{M}$

The flexomagnetoelectric effect appears in spiral multiferroics or micromagnetic structures like domain walls and magnetic vortexes. Ferroelectricity developed from micromagnetic structure can appear in any magnetic material even in centrosymmetric one. Building of symmetry classification of domain walls leads to determination of the type of electric polarization rotation in volume of any magnetic domain wall. Existing symmetry classification of magnetic domain walls was applied for predictions of electric polarization spatial distribution in their volumes. The predictions for almost all symmetry groups conform with phenomenology in which inhomogeneous magnetization couples with homogeneous polarization. The total synergy between symmetry and phenomenology theory appears if energy terms with electrical polarization spatial derivatives are taken into account.

== See also ==
- Piezoelectricity
- Multiferroics
- Exchange interaction
