= Monostrontium ruthenate =

Strontium ruthenate
Properties
Chemical formula	SrRuO3
Molar mass	236.69 g/mol
Appearance	Black solid
Density	6.5–6.7 g/cm³
Melting point	2575 K
Solubility in water	Insoluble in water; dissolves in periodate solution
- Except where otherwise noted, data are given for materials in their standard state (at 25 °C [77 °F], 100 kPa). Infobox references

Monostrontium ruthenate (SrRuO_{3}, SRO) is a conductive perovskite oxide with the chemical formula SrRuO_{3}. It is one of the few known 4d transition-metal oxides that exhibits itinerant ferromagnetism and metallic conductivity. Owing to its combination of electrical conductivity, chemical stability, and compatibility with other perovskite oxides, SRO is widely used as an electrode material in oxide electronics and epitaxial heterostructures.

== History ==
SrRuO_{3} was first synthesized and characterized in the 1950s as part of broader investigations into complex oxide perovskites containing transition metals. Interest in the material increased substantially during the 1990s with the development of epitaxial thin-film growth techniques, which enabled the fabrication of high-quality single-crystal films. The discovery that SRO combines metallic conductivity with ferromagnetic ordering made it an important model system for studying correlated-electron phenomena in oxide materials and a technologically important electrode for ferroelectric and multiferroic devices.

== Structure ==
SrRuO_{3} crystallizes in a distorted perovskite structure in which strontium occupies the A-site and ruthenium occupies the B-site of the ABO_{3} lattice. At room temperature, bulk SRO adopts an orthorhombic crystal structure (space group Pbnm) arising from rotations and tilts of the RuO_{6} octahedra.

The crystal structure is sensitive to epitaxial strain. Thin films grown on lattice-mismatched substrates can undergo strain-induced structural distortions and may adopt tetragonal or other symmetry variants. These structural changes strongly influence the electronic and magnetic properties of the material.

== Physical properties ==
=== Electronic transport ===
SrRuO_{3} is a metallic conductor over a wide temperature range. Unlike many transition-metal oxides, it remains metallic at low temperatures and exhibits relatively low electrical resistivity. Its transport properties reflect moderate electron-electron correlations associated with the Ru 4d electronic states.

The electrical conductivity depends strongly on film quality, thickness, stoichiometry, and strain. Ruthenium deficiency generally increases resistivity and suppresses magnetic ordering, while high-quality epitaxial films can exhibit transport properties approaching those of bulk single crystals.

=== Magnetism ===
SRO is an itinerant ferromagnet with a Curie temperature typically around 150–160 K. The ferromagnetism arises from partially filled Ru 4d bands and is often described using an intermediate picture between localized and itinerant magnetism.

The material exhibits strong magnetocrystalline anisotropy, and the orientation of the magnetic easy axis depends on crystal structure, epitaxial strain, and temperature. Thin films have served as model systems for studies of magnetic domains, domain-wall transport, and current-induced domain-wall motion.

=== Optical and electronic structure ===
Optical spectroscopy, photoemission measurements, and first-principles calculations have shown that SRO is a moderately correlated metal. Its electronic structure is dominated by hybridized Ru 4d and O 2p states near the Fermi level. Spectroscopic studies reveal quasiparticle behavior together with signatures of electron correlation and spin-dependent electronic structure.

== Applications ==
The combination of metallic conductivity, chemical stability, and structural compatibility with perovskite oxides has made SRO one of the most widely used electrode materials in oxide thin-film technology. SRO is frequently employed as a bottom or top electrode in epitaxial ferroelectric capacitors based on materials such as barium titanate and lead zirconate titanate. It is also used in multiferroic heterostructures, oxide superlattices, tunnel junctions, and other devices where a conductive oxide with a close lattice match to functional perovskites is required.

Because SRO is ferromagnetic, it has also attracted interest in spintronics and magnetoelectronic devices, particularly as a model oxide ferromagnet that can be integrated into complex oxide heterostructures.

== See also ==
- Perovskite (structure)
- Distrontium ruthenate
