= Mohammad Hafezi =

Physicist at the University of Maryland

- Education: Sharif University of Technology; École Polytechnique; Harvard University (PhD)
- Known for: Topological photonics
- Awards: Sloan Research Fellowship (2015); Simons Investigator (2020); Fellow of the American Physical Society (2021); Humboldt Research Award (2025)
- Scientific career
- Fields: Physics, quantum optics, topological photonics, Quantum simulation
- Workplaces: University of Maryland, College Park; Joint Quantum Institute

Mohammad Hafezi is a physicist and the Minta Martin Professor at the University of Maryland, College Park, where he holds a joint appointment in the Department of Physics and the Department of Electrical and Computer Engineering. He is a Fellow of the Joint Quantum Institute (JQI), a joint institute of the University of Maryland and the National Institute of Standards and Technology. In 2021, he was elected a Fellow of the American Physical Society "for pioneering theoretical and experimental work in topological photonics and quantum synthetic matter".

== Early life and education ==
As a student, Hafezi won a silver medal at the 29th International Physics Olympiad, held in Reykjavík, Iceland, in 1998. He studied for two years at Sharif University of Technology before completing his undergraduate degree in physics at the École Polytechnique in France in 2003. He received his PhD in physics from Harvard University in 2009 with a thesis on Strongly interacting systems in AMO physics in the group of Mikhail Lukin.

== Career ==
After his doctorate, Hafezi was a research associate at the Joint Quantum Institute before joining the University of Maryland faculty in 2014. He was promoted to full professor with tenure in 2021 and holds the Minta Martin professorship. He is a Fellow of the Joint Quantum Institute and the Quantum Technology Center, and an affiliate of the Joint Center for Quantum Information and Computer Science at Maryland.

== Research ==
Hafezi's research involves theoretical and experimental investigation of quantum properties of light-matter interaction, for applications in classical and quantum information processing and sensing.

Early in his career, Hafezi worked on quantum simulation proposals of systems that host topologically ordered many-body states on a lattice, of the kind later called fractional Chern insulators. In particular, he proposed schemes for realizing fractional quantum Hall states with ultracold atoms in optical lattices. Because neutral atoms do not couple directly to a magnetic field, such proposals required synthesizing an effective (artificial) gauge field to reproduce the physics of charged particles in a magnetic field. Following this work on neutral atoms, Hafezi turned to exploring topological physics for other neutral particles—in particular photons—which similarly do not experience a magnetic field directly.

In 2011, Hafezi and collaborators proposed that photons in arrays of coupled optical ring resonators could exhibit topologically protected edge transport, providing robustness against fabrication disorder. His team subsequently demonstrated topological edge states of light on a silicon chip and the first direct measurement of topological invariants in a photonic system.

His group extended these ideas to quantum light, demonstrating a topological source of quantum light based on correlated photon pairs and, with collaborators, a topological interface for quantum emitters. In 2024, his group reported the observation of topological frequency combs in nested photonic resonator arrays.

His research group also studies the use of quantum-optical techniques to probe and control correlated electron systems.

== Honors and awards ==
- 1998 – Silver medal, 29th International Physics Olympiad (Reykjavík, Iceland)
- 2015 – Sloan Research Fellowship, Alfred P. Sloan Foundation
- 2015 – Young Investigator Program award, Office of Naval Research
- 2019, 2020 – Finalist, Blavatnik National Awards for Young Scientists, Physical Sciences & Engineering
- 2020 – Simons Investigator in Physics, Simons Foundation
- 2021 – Fellow of the American Physical Society, "For pioneering theoretical and experimental work in topological photonics and quantum synthetic matter."
- 2025 – Humboldt Research Award, Alexander von Humboldt Foundation
