= Xiaolin Wang =

Xiaolin Wang is a Chinese-Australian scientist studying advanced materials synthesis and characterisation and spintronics. He is a University of Wollongong professor, and director of its Institute for Superconducting and Electronic Materials, and an Australian Research Council future fellow.

== Discoveries ==
Wang discovered a new class of materials in 2008, the spin gapless semiconductor, creating interest and activity in the condensed matter community. In 2012 he observed resistance dependence on applied magnetic field in a topological insulator nano-sheet at room temperature, paving the way for topological insulator applications in magnetoelectronic sensors, spin electronic devices, mechatronics, and other multifunctional devices.

== Career ==
Wang has a BSc (physics) and MSc (physics) awarded at Tsinghua University, China, or Shandong University, China, and a PhD (materials engineering) awarded at the University of Wollongong, Australia, in 2000.

He was research fellow Johannes-Kepler-University Austria 1993–95, guest research scientist at Atomic Institute of Austrian Universities Austria 1995–96, associate fellow University of Wollongong 2000–02, Australian Research Council APD Fellow 2002–05, visiting fellow, National Institute for Materials Science Japan 2003, visiting scholar, Ohio State University 2004 and QEII Fellow University of Wollongong 2005–2009.

He was made an associate professor at the University of Wollongong 2006–08, and professor from 2008. He has supervised more than 30 PhDs and Mphil, plus more than 10 academic staff. He is a theme leader and node leader at ARC Centre of Excellence in Future Low-Energy Electronics Technologies (FLEET).

From 2013 he has coordinated University of Wollongong and FLEET topological-insulator charge and spin transport research collaborations with Xue Qikun at Tsinghua University, the discoverer of the quantum anomalous Hall effect. In 2017, he received the University of Wollongong Vice-Chancellor's Research Excellence Award For Researcher Of The Year.

=== Selected publications ===
- X. L. Wang, “A proposal for a new class of materials: Spin gapless semiconductors”, Physical Review Letters 100, 156404 (2008).
- X.L. Wang, Y. Du, S.X. Dou, and C. Zhang, “Room Temperature Giant and Linear Magnetoresistance in Topological Insulator Bi2Te3 Nanosheets”, Physical Review Letters, 108, 266806 (2012)
- M. Veldhorst et al., “Josephson supercurrent through a topological insulator surface state”, Nature Materials, 11, 417 (2012)
