= Daniel C. Tsui =

Chinese-American physicist

- 崔琦
- Tsui at a dinner honoring Nobel Prize laureates
- Born: February 28, 1939 (age 87); Baofeng, Henan, Republic of China
- Citizenship: United States
- Education: Augustana College (BS); University of Chicago (PhD)
- Known for: Fractional quantum Hall effect
- Spouse: Linda Varland
- Children: 2
- Awards: Oliver E. Buckley Condensed Matter Prize (1984); Nobel Prize in Physics (1998)
- Scientific career
- Fields: Experimental physics Electrical engineering
- Workplaces: Princeton University; Columbia University; Bell Laboratories; Boston University

Daniel Chee Tsui (Chinese: 崔琦; pinyin: Cuī Qí, born February 28, 1939) is an American physicist. He is currently serving as the Professor of Electrical Engineering, emeritus, at Princeton University. Tsui's areas of research include electrical properties of thin films and microstructures of semiconductors and solid-state physics.

Tsui won the 1998 Nobel Prize in Physics with Robert B. Laughlin and Horst L. Störmer "for their discovery of a new form of quantum fluid with fractionally charged excitations."

== Early life and education ==
Tsui was born into a Chinese agricultural family with two illiterate parents in Fanzhuang (Henan) (范庄), Baofeng, Henan, Republic of China, on February 28, 1939. Born in the midst of Second World War, Tsui described his early childhood memories as being "filled with the years of drought, flood and war which were constantly on the consciousness of the inhabitants of my over-populated village."

In 1951, Tsui left for Hong Kong to attend Pui Ching Middle School in Kowloon, beginning his formal education at the level of sixth grade in his second year in Hong Kong. Tsui recalled facing difficulties due to his lack of familiarity with Cantonese dialect used.

Upon graduating in 1957, Tsui was admitted to the National Taiwan University Medical School, but due to uncertainties over whether he would be able to return to his family in China, he remained in Hong Kong to enroll in Special Classes Centre, a special two-year government program intended to prepare high school graduates for entrance into the University of Hong Kong. While preparing for the entrance examination to the University of Hong Kong in spring of 1958, Tsui was awarded a full scholarship to attend Augustana College, his church pastor's Lutheran alma mater in the United States. Accepting the scholarship, Tsui arrived at Augustana College just after Labor Day of 1958.

After spending three years at Augustana College, Tsui graduated Phi Beta Kappa in 1961 as the only student of Chinese descent in his college. Tsui continued his study in physics at the University of Chicago, from where he received his Ph.D. in physics in 1967 after completing a doctoral dissertation, titled "de Haas-van Alphen effect and electronic band structure of nickel", under the supervision of Royal Stark. He remarked that due to the influence of prominent Chinese theoretical physicists and Nobel laureates C. N. Yang and T. D. Lee, both of whom studied at the University of Chicago, he had always known that he wanted to pursue graduate studies in physics at the institution.

== Career ==
After receiving his Ph.D. and then remaining in Chicago for a year of postdoctoral research, Tsui joined the research staff at Bell Laboratories to perform research in solid state physics in 1968. At Bell Laboratories, instead of studying mainstream topics of interest in semiconductor physics such as optics and high energy band-structures or their applications in devices, Tsui devoted his attention to a new field called the physics of two-dimensional electrons.

Tsui and Störmer made the groundbreaking discovery of the fractional quantum Hall effect in 1982, while Laughlin provided a theoretical interpretation for the discovery the following year. This discovery would eventually be the reason of their winning of the 1998 Nobel Prize in Physics.

Shortly after the discovery, Tsui departed from Bell Laboratories and joined the faculty of the department of electrical engineering and computer science at Princeton University with the support of two Nobel laureates in February 1982. After 28 years at Princeton, Tsui transferred to emeritus status in 2010.

He was also an adjunct senior research scientist in the physics department of Columbia University, and a research professor at Boston University.

Tsui is one of the 20 American recipients of the Nobel Prize in Physics to sign a letter addressed to President George W. Bush in May 2008, urging him to "reverse the damage done to basic science research in the Fiscal Year 2008 Omnibus Appropriations Bill" by requesting additional emergency funding for the Department of Energy's Office of Science, the National Science Foundation, and the National Institute of Standards and Technology.

As of 2022, Tsui is among only three of Chinese Nobel laureates who voiced their support for Ukraine.

== Personal life ==
While a graduate student at the University of Chicago, Tsui met Linda Varland, who was an undergraduate student there at the time, and the two married after the latter's graduation. Tsui is a naturalized U.S. citizen. Tsui and Varland have two daughters, Aileen and Judith. Judith graduated magna cum laude from Princeton University with a B.A. in anthropology in 1991 and is now an associate professor of medicine at the University of Washington School of Medicine.

== Awards and honors ==
- Oliver E. Buckley Condensed Matter Prize, 1984
- Fellow of the American Physical Society, elected 1985
- Member of the U.S. National Academy of Sciences, elected 1987
- Fellow of the American Association for the Advancement of Science, elected 1991
- Benjamin Franklin Medal in Physics, 1998
- Nobel Prize in Physics, 1998
- Member of the American Academy of Arts and Sciences, elected 2000
- Member of the U.S. National Academy of Engineering, elected 2004
- Foreign Academician of the Chinese Academy of Sciences, elected 2000
- Academician of Academia Sinica, Taipei

== See also ==
- Quantum hall effect
