= Mordehai Heiblum =

Israeli electrical engineer and condensed matter physicist (born 1947)

- מוטי הייבלום
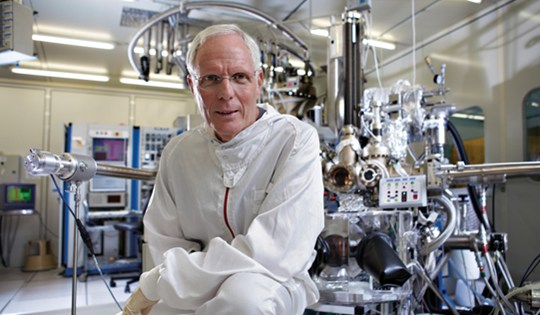
- Born: 25 May 1947 (age 79); Holon, Israel
- Education: Technion, Carnegie Mellon University, University of California, Berkeley
- Awards: IBM Outstanding Innovation Award (1986); Rothschild Prize in Physics (2008); EMET Prize (2013); Oliver E. Buckley Prize (2021); Wolf Prize in Physics (2025)
- Scientific career
- Fields: Mesoscopic physics Electrical engineering
- Workplaces: Weizmann Institute of Science, IBM Thomas J. Watson Research Center
- Doctoral advisor: John Roy Whinnery
- Doctoral students: Amir Yacoby

Mordehai Heiblum (Hebrew: מוטי הייבלום – sometimes called Moty Heiblum, born May 25, 1947, in Holon) is an Israeli electrical engineer and condensed matter physicist, known for his research in mesoscopic physics. His experimental techniques allowed to demonstrate the fractional charge of the fractional quantum Hall effect and measuring the of half-integer thermal conductance quantum at filling fraction 5/2. For these discoveries he earned several prizes, including the 2025 Wolf Prize in Physics.

He was elected a Member of the National Academy of Sciences in 2025.

== Biography ==
Moty Heiblum was born and raised in Holon. His mother was the only Holocaust survivor in her immediate family, and most of his father's family perished in the Holocaust. From 1967 to 1971 Moty Heiblum served in the Israeli Defense Force (IDF) in the IDF Communications Corps and was an instructor at the IDF Air Force Technical School. Heiblum graduated in electrical engineering from the Technion with a bachelor's degree in 1973 and from Carnegie-Mellon University with a master's degree in 1974. He received in 1978 his Ph.D. with thesis Characteristics of metal-oxide-metal devices supervised by John Roy Whinnery. After completing his Ph.D., Heiblum joined the IBM Thomas J. Watson Research Center.

After working at the IBM Thomas J. Watson Research Center for 12 years, Heiblum returned in 1990 to Israel and established at the Weizmann Institute, with the support of Professor Yoseph Imry, the Joseph H. and Belle R. Braun Center for Submicron Research with the mission to "study and develop submicron semiconductor structures working in the mesoscopic regime." The initial investment for the Submicron Center was approximately $16 million. Heiblum has headed the Submicron Center since its founding in 1990. That same year he was appointed a full professor at the Weizmann Institute. He established the Department of Condensed Matter Physics at the Weizmann Institute and was its first director from 1993 to 1996 and from 2007 to 2012 he was again its director. In 2000 he was appointed to the Alex and Ida Susan Professorial Chair of Submicron Studies.

From 1991 to 1992, Heiblum headed a government committee that advised the Minister of Science on how to encourage the microelectronics industry in the State of Israel. Since 2001, he has chaired the board of directors of Braude College of Engineering. From 1993 to 1996, he was a visiting professor for several weeks each summer at the Vienna University of Technology. From 1996 to 1997 he was on sabbatical as a visiting professor at Stanford University in combination with Hewlett Packard Labs in Palo Alto, California. He was an editor for the journal Semiconductor Science and Technology and is now an editor for the journal Solid State Communications. He organized and conducted, in collaboration with Professor Elisha Cohen of the Technion, the 1998 International Conference of Semiconductors, which was attended by about 1,100 people and held in Jerusalem.

His doctoral students include Amir Yacoby, graduated in 1994.

== Research ==
The main focus of Heiblum's research is the quantum behavior of electrons in high-purity mesoscopic materials, and especially the quantum Hall effect (QHE) regime. Noteworthy highlights of the research done by him and his group are "novel electronic interferometers – demonstrating one-electron and two-electron interference; which-path detectors – allowing to turn 'on and off' electrons' coherence; detection of fractional charges via sensitive shot noise measurements; and observation of quantized heat flow in the fractional abelian and non-abelian states in the QHE regime."

== Awards ==
He received in 1986 the IBM Outstanding Innovation Award and in 2013 the EMET Prize. He was elected a life fellow of the IEEE, a fellow of the American Physical Society (1990), and a member of Israel Academy of Sciences and Humanities (2008). In 2008, he received the Rothschild Prize in physics.

In 2021, he was the single recipient of the Oliver E. Buckley Condensed Matter Prize with citation:

For discoveries, enabled by ingenious experimental methods, of novel quantum electronic phenomena in mesoscopic and quantum Hall systems, including observation and interpretation of one-electron and two-electron interference, charge fractionalization, and quantized heat conductance in fractional Hall states.

In 2025, he was announced as the co-recipient of the Wolf Prize in Physics together with Jainendra K. Jain (Penn State) and James P. Eisenstein (CalTech) for laying the foundation to the understanding of the fractional quantum Hall effect.

== Family ==
Moty Heiblum's wife Rachel has a PhD in biology from the Hebrew University of Jerusalem. She worked in the Faculty of Agriculture of the Hebrew University of Jerusalem's Rehovot campus. They have four children. He has a younger brother, Zohar Heiblum, who is a director, manager, turn-around specialist, and investor in the high-tech industry.

== Selected publications ==
- Heiblum, M.; Harris, J. (1975). "Analysis of curved optical waveguides by conformal transformation". IEEE Journal of Quantum Electronics. 11 (2): 75–83. Bibcode:1975IJQE...11...75H. doi:10.1109/JQE.1975.1068563.
- Heiblum, M.; Nathan, M. I.; Thomas, D. C.; Knoedler, C. M. (1985). "Direct Observation of Ballistic Transport in GaAs". Physical Review Letters. 55 (20): 2200–2203. Bibcode:1985PhRvL..55.2200H. doi:10.1103/PhysRevLett.55.2200. PMID 10032074.
- Smith, T. P.; Goldberg, B. B.; Stiles, P. J.; Heiblum, M. (1985). "Direct measurement of the density of states of a two-dimensional electron gas". Physical Review B. 32 (4): 2696–2699. Bibcode:1985PhRvB..32.2696S. doi:10.1103/PhysRevB.32.2696. PMID 9937366.
- Reznikov, M.; Heiblum, M.; Shtrikman, Hadas; Mahalu, D. (1995). "Temporal Correlation of Electrons: Suppression of Shot Noise in a Ballistic Quantum Point Contact". Physical Review Letters. 75 (18): 3340–3343. Bibcode:1995PhRvL..75.3340R. doi:10.1103/PhysRevLett.75.3340. PMID 10059559.
- Yacoby, A.; Heiblum, M.; Mahalu, D.; Shtrikman, Hadas (1995). "Coherence and Phase Sensitive Measurements in a Quantum Dot". Physical Review Letters. 74 (20): 4047–4050. Bibcode:1995PhRvL..74.4047Y. doi:10.1103/PhysRevLett.74.4047. PMID 10058399.
- Schuster, R.; Buks, E.; Heiblum, M.; Mahalu, D.; Umansky, V.; Shtrikman, Hadas (1997). "Phase measurement in a quantum dot via a double-slit interference experiment". Nature. 385 (6615): 417–420. Bibcode:1997Natur.385..417S. doi:10.1038/385417a0. S2CID 4282732.
- De-Picciotto, R.; Reznikov, M.; Heiblum, M.; Umansky, V.; Bunin, G.; Mahalu, D. (1998). "Direct observation of a fractional charge". Physica B: Condensed Matter. 249–251 (1–4): 395–400. arXiv:cond-mat/9707289. Bibcode:1998PhyB..249..395D. doi:10.1016/S0921-4526(98)00139-2. S2CID 4310360.
- Buks, E.; Schuster, R.; Heiblum, M.; Mahalu, D.; Umansky, V. (1998). "Dephasing in electron interference by a 'which-path' detector". Nature. 391 (6670): 871–874. Bibcode:1998Natur.391..871B. doi:10.1038/36057. S2CID 4390389.
- Reznikov, M.; Picciotto, R. de; Griffiths, T. G.; Heiblum, M.; Umansky, V. (1999). "Observation of quasiparticles with one-fifth of an electron's charge". Nature. 399 (6733): 238–241. arXiv:cond-mat/9901150. Bibcode:1999Natur.399..238R. doi:10.1038/20384. S2CID 4307778.
- Ji, Yang; Heiblum, M.; Sprinzak, D.; Mahalu, D.; Shtrikman, Hadas (2000). "Phase Evolution in a Kondo-Correlated System". Science. 290 (5492): 779–783. arXiv:cond-mat/0007332. Bibcode:2000Sci...290..779J. doi:10.1126/science.290.5492.779. PMID 11052936. S2CID 15289299.
- Ji, Yang; Chung, Yunchul; Sprinzak, D.; Heiblum, M.; Mahalu, D.; Shtrikman, Hadas (2003). "An electronic Mach–Zehnder interferometer". Nature. 422 (6930): 415–418. arXiv:cond-mat/0303553. Bibcode:2003Natur.422..415J. doi:10.1038/nature01503. PMID 12660779. S2CID 4425291.
- Avinun-Kalish, M.; Heiblum, M.; Zarchin, O.; Mahalu, D.; Umansky, V. (2005). "Crossover from 'mesoscopic' to 'universal' phase for electron transmission in quantum dots". Nature. 436 (7050): 529–533. arXiv:cond-mat/0505716. Bibcode:2005Natur.436..529A. doi:10.1038/nature03899. PMID 16049482. S2CID 4362572.
- Neder, I.; Heiblum, M.; Levinson, Y.; Mahalu, D.; Umansky, V. (2006). "Unexpected Behavior in a Two-Path Electron Interferometer". Physical Review Letters. 96 (1) 016804. arXiv:cond-mat/0508024. Bibcode:2006PhRvL..96a6804N. doi:10.1103/PhysRevLett.96.016804. PMID 16486497.
- Neder, I.; Ofek, N.; Chung, Y.; Heiblum, M.; Mahalu, D.; Umansky, V. (2007). "Interference between two indistinguishable electrons from independent sources". Nature. 448 (7151): 333–337. Bibcode:2007Natur.448..333N. doi:10.1038/nature05955. PMID 17637665. S2CID 2222573.
- Dolev, M.; Heiblum, M.; Umansky, V.; Stern, Ady; Mahalu, D. (2008). "Observation of a quarter of an electron charge at the ν = 5/2 quantum Hall state". Nature. 452 (7189): 829–834. arXiv:0802.0930. Bibcode:2008Natur.452..829D. doi:10.1038/nature06855. PMID 18421345. S2CID 54871726.
- Bid, Aveek; Ofek, N.; Inoue, H.; Heiblum, M.; Kane, C. L.; Umansky, V.; Mahalu, D. (2010). "Observation of neutral modes in the fractional quantum Hall regime". Nature. 466 (7306): 585–590. arXiv:1005.5724. Bibcode:2010Natur.466..585B. doi:10.1038/nature09277. PMID 20671702. S2CID 205221857.
- Das, Anindya; Ronen, Yuval; Most, Yonatan; Oreg, Yuval; Heiblum, Moty; Shtrikman, Hadas (2012). "Zero-bias peaks and splitting in an Al–InAs nanowire topological superconductor as a signature of Majorana fermions". Nature Physics. 8 (12): 887–895. arXiv:1205.7073. Bibcode:2012NatPh...8..887D. doi:10.1038/nphys2479. S2CID 119297473.
- Banerjee, Mitali; Heiblum, Moty; Rosenblatt, Amir; Oreg, Yuval; Feldman, Dima E.; Stern, Ady; Umansky, Vladimir (2017). "Observed quantization of anyonic heat flow". Nature. 545 (7652): 75–79. arXiv:1611.07374. Bibcode:2017Natur.545...75B. doi:10.1038/nature22052. PMID 28424514. S2CID 205255335.
