= Bipolar magnetic semiconductor =

Type of semiconductor, spintronic material

Bipolar magnetic semiconductors (BMSs) are a special class of magnetic semiconductors characterized by a unique electronic structure, where valence band maximum (VBM) and conduction band minimum (CBM) are fully spin polarized in the opposite spin direction. BMSs can be described by three energy gaps, the spin-flip gap Δ2 in valence band (VB), band gap Δ1 and spin-flip gap Δ3 in conduction band (CB). Up to now, bipolar magnetic semiconductors, together with half-metal and spin gapless semiconductor, have been viewed as three important classes of spintronic materials.

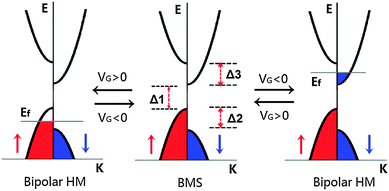
Manipulation of carrier's spin orientation in bipolar magnetic semiconductors by electrical gating.

== Properties and potential applications ==
The proposal of bipolar magnetic semiconductor (BMS) is aimed to realize electrical control of carriers' spin orientation, which is a key scientific problem in developing high performance spintronics devices, since electric field can be easily applied locally, in contrast to magnetic field. In BMS, the carriers' spin orientation can be controlled simply by altering the sign of the applied gate voltage. Under zero gate voltage (V_{G} = 0), BMS is semiconducting. Under negative gate voltages (V_{G} < 0) which shift down the material's Fermi level (E_{F}) into spin-flip gap Δ2 in valence band, BMS conducts with carriers fully spin up polarized, while the conducting carriers change to be fully spin down polarized when positive gate voltages (V_{G} > 0) push the Fermi level (E_{F}) up into spin-flip gap Δ3 in conduction band. BMS is expected to be applied as bipolar field effect spin filter and field effect spin valve, or entangled electron detectors and separators.

== Materials developments ==
A number of BMS materials have been theoretically predicted, such as MnPSe_{3} nanosheets, Heusler alloys FeVXSi (X = Ti, Zr), double perovskites A_{2}CrOsO_{6} (A=Ca, Sr, Ba) and DPP-based metal–organic framework. However, the experimental realization of electrical control of spin orientation in these materials still keeps a challenge and needs further experimental efforts.
