= Jainendra K. Jain =

Indian-American physicist (born 1960)

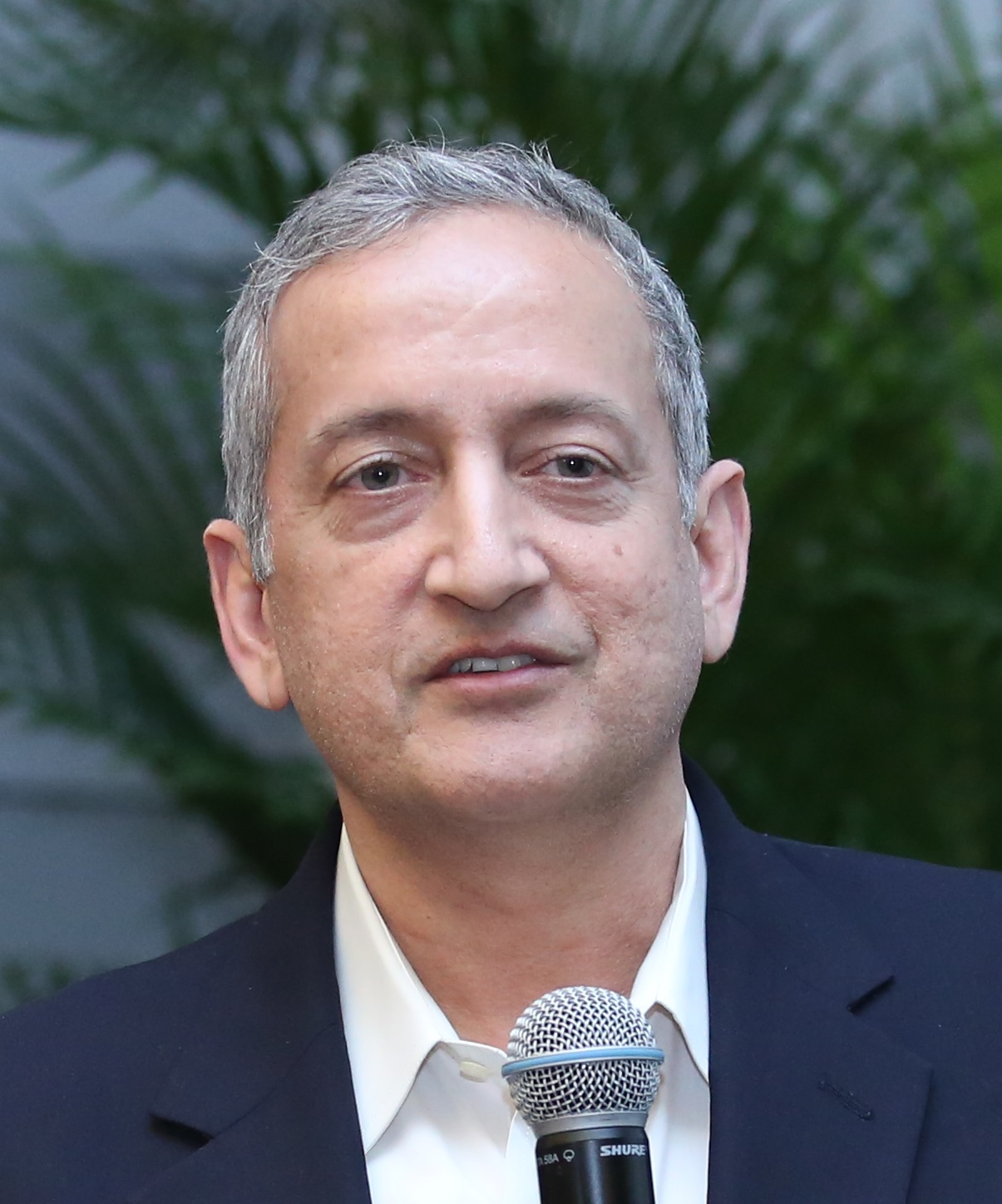
- Born: January 17, 1960 (age 66); Rajasthan, India
- Education: Maharaja College, Jaipur; IIT Kanpur; Stony Brook University
- Known for: Composite fermions Jain sequences Jain states
- Awards: Oliver E. Buckley Condensed Matter Prize (2002) member, National Academy of Sciences (2021); Foreign Fellow Indian National Science Academy (2025); Wolf Prize in Physics (2025)
- Scientific career
- Fields: Condensed matter theory
- Doctoral advisor: Philip B. Allen, Steven Kivelson

Jainendra K. Jain (born January 17, 1960) is an Indian-American physicist and the Evan Pugh University Professor and the Eberly Chair in Physics at the Pennsylvania State University. He received the Oliver E. Buckley Prize of the American Physical Society in 2002, was elected to the National Academy of Sciences in 2021, and was selected Foreign Fellow of the Indian National Science Academy in 2024. He was the co-recipient of 2025 Wolf Prize in Physics along with James P. Eisenstein and Mordehai Heiblum. Jain is known for his theoretical work on quantum many body systems, most notably for postulating particles known as the composite fermions.

== Biography ==
Jain received his primary, middle and high school education in a government school in the rural village of Sambhar, Rajasthan, located at the eastern margin of Thar desert in India. He received bachelor's degree at Maharaja College, Jaipur, his master's degree in physics at Indian Institute of Technology Kanpur and PhD at the Stony Brook University, where he worked with Profs. Philip B. Allen and Steven Kivelson. After post-doctoral positions at the University of Maryland and the Yale University he returned to the Stony Brook University as a faculty member in 1989. In 1998, he moved to the Pennsylvania State University as the first Erwin W. Mueller Professor of Physics.

In 2026 Jain was appointed Director of Lodha Theoretical Physics Institute, Mumbai.

Jain is a quantum physicist in the field of condensed matter theory with interests in strongly interacting electronic systems in low dimensions. As the originator of the exotic particles called composite fermions, he pioneered and developed the composite fermion theory of the fractional quantum Hall effect and unified the fractional and the integral quantum Hall effects. His writings include a monograph Composite Fermions, published in 2007 by the Cambridge University Press. He co-edited with Bertrand Halperin a book Fractional Quantum Hall Effects: New Developments, published in 2020 by World Scientific.

Because of injuries sustained in a childhood accident, Jain walks with the aid of a prosthesis. After being awarded the Wolf Prize in Physics, he recounted his journey as: “Looking back, it is hard to believe how incredibly fortunate I have been. Growing up in a poor village in India, traumatized by an accident that left me on crutches with a lifelong disability, I did not think I would ever walk again or attend college, let alone pursue my dream of becoming a physicist.” He credits Jaipur Foot with enabling him to continue education.

== Research ==
Jain predicted that when two-dimensional electrons are subjected to a large magnetic field, they dress themselves with an even number of quantized vortices to form emergent particles termed composite fermions. Composite fermions are pictured as electrons dressed with magnetic flux quanta, and are predicted to experience a substantially reduced magnetic field. Thus, the strongly correlated 2D electrons in a high magnetic field become weakly interacting composite fermions at a reduced magnetic field. Composite fermions correctly predict the rich phenomenology of this system originating from a variety of strongly correlated states of electrons, including the fractional quantum Hall states, the Fermi-liquid like metallic states, superconductor-like paired states, and crystal states.

Jain theorized that the integer quantum Hall effect of composite fermions carrying 2p flux quanta shows as the fractional quantum Hall effect of electrons at fractions n/(2pn±1), where n and p are integers. These fractions, along with their hole partners 1 - n/(2pn±1), termed the Jain sequences, account for nearly all known fractional quantum Hall states, called the Jain states. Experimental evidence has been reported for four species of composite fermions, those with 2, 4, 6, and 8 flux quanta attached.

Jain also constructed ansatz wave functions for the fractional quantum Hall states, which were shown by him and his collaborators to be extremely accurate. They demonstrated that the excited composite fermions, also called "quasiparticles", exhibit fractional charge and anyon statistics. They generalized the composite-fermion framework to include the spin (or valley) degree of freedom and to bilayers, and successfully predicted the phase diagram of composite-fermion crystals. They further showed that the residual interactions among composite fermions can cause pairing of composite fermions at even-denominator fractions in higher Landau levels, in wide quantum wells, or with large Landau-level mixing.. Jain also is the originator the "parton" construction, which generates candidate fractional quantum Hall states beyond the Jain sequences and includes non-Abelian states.

=== Lodha Theoretical Physics Institute ===
Lodha Theoretical Physics Institute
- Formation: May 2026; 4 months ago
- Type: Non-profit
- Location: Mumbai, India
- Key people: Jainendra K. Jain

The Lodha Theoretical Physics Institute (LTPI) is a private physics research centre located in Mumbai, and is led by Jain. It is India's only private physics research institute, inaugurated on May 27, 2026, in Mumbai.

== Honors ==
- Fellow, John Simon Guggenheim Memorial Foundation, 1991.
- Fellow, Alfred P. Sloan Foundation, 1997.
- Fellow of the American Physical Society, 1997. Citation: "For the "Composite Fermion" theory of the fractional quantum Hall effect."
- Appointed Erwin W. Mueller Professor of Physics, Pennsylvania State University, 1998.
- Oliver E. Buckley Prize awarded by the American Physical Society for a most important contribution to the advancement of knowledge in Condensed Matter Physics, 2002, along with Nicholas Read and Robert Willett. Citation: "For theoretical and experimental work establishing the composite fermion model for the half-filled Landau level and other quantized Hall systems"
- Elected member of American Academy of Arts and Sciences, 2008. Citation: "Evan Pugh University Professor and Erwin W. Mueller Professor of Physics. Predicted that electrons in the factional quantum Hall effect regime capture quantized vortices to form new particles, which he named composite fermions. Subsequently observed, composite fermions brought clarity to the subject and spawned new lines of theoretical inquiries and elegant new experiments."
- Distinguished Alumnus Award of IIT Kanpur, 2010.
- Fellow, American Association for the Advancement of Science, 2011.
- Appointed Evan Pugh University Professor, named after the first President of Pennsylvania State University, 2012.
- Elected to National Academy of Sciences, 2021.
- Appointed Holder of Eberly Family Chair, Pennsylvania State University, 2023.
- Elected Foreign Fellow of the Indian National Science Academy, 2025. Citation: "Prof Jain predicted a new class of exotic particles, which he named “composite fermions,” and explained the fractional quantum Hall effect as the integer quantum Hall effect of composite fermions. In doing so, he accomplished a unification of the fractional and the integer quantum Hall effects, two Nobel prize winning phenomena. His discovery of composite fermions is recognized as a singular and transformative development in the realm of condensed matter physics."
- Wolf Prize in Physics, 2025 together with James P. Eisenstein and Mordehai Heiblum for "For advancing our understanding of the surprising properties of two-dimensional electron systems in strong magnetic fields".
