= Robert B. Laughlin =

American physicist

Robert Betts Laughlin
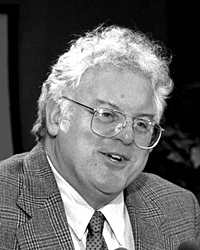
- Born: November 1, 1950 (age 75); Visalia, California, United States
- Education: MIT; University of California, Berkeley
- Known for: Quantum Hall effect
- Awards: E. O. Lawrence Award (1984); Oliver E. Buckley Condensed Matter Prize (1986); Nobel Prize in Physics (1998); The Franklin Medal (1998)
- Scientific career
- Fields: Theoretical physics
- Workplaces: Stanford
- Doctoral advisor: John D. Joannopoulos

Robert Betts Laughlin (born November 1, 1950) is an American physicist. He is the Anne T. and Robert M. Bass Professor of Physics and Applied Physics at Stanford University. Along with Horst L. Störmer of Columbia University and Daniel C. Tsui of Princeton University, he was awarded a share of the 1998 Nobel Prize in physics for their explanation of the fractional quantum Hall effect.

In 1983, Laughlin was first to provide a many body wave function, now known as the Laughlin wavefunction, for the fractional quantum Hall effect, which was able to correctly explain the fractionalized charge observed in experiments. This state has since been interpreted as the integer quantum Hall effect of the composite fermion.

His 2017 paper, "Pumped thermal grid storage with heat exchange" inspired Project Malta at Google X and subsequently Malta inc.

== Biography ==
Laughlin was born in Visalia, California. He earned a B.A. in mathematics at the University of California, Berkeley in 1972, and his Ph.D. in physics in 1979 at the Massachusetts Institute of Technology (MIT). Between 2004 and 2006, he served as the president of KAIST in Daejeon, South Korea.

== Honors and awards ==
- E. O. Lawrence Award in Physics – 1984
- Oliver E. Buckley Prize – 1986
- Elected Fellow of the American Physical Society - 1986
- National Academy of Sciences – 1994
- Benjamin Franklin Medal for Physics of the Franklin Institute – 1998
- Nobel Prize in Physics – 1998
- Golden Plate Award of the American Academy of Achievement – 1999
- Doctorate of Letters, University of Maryland – 2005
- Onsager Medal – 2007

== Publications ==
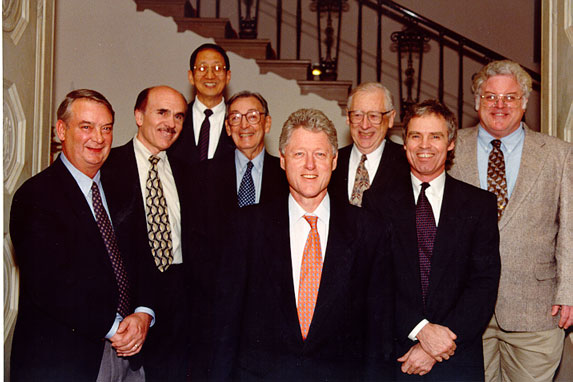
Laughlin (right) in the White House together with other 1998 US Nobel Prize Winners and the President Bill Clinton

Laughlin published a book entitled A Different Universe: Reinventing Physics from the Bottom Down in 2005. The book argues for emergence as a replacement for reductionism, in addition to general commentary on hot-topic issues.

- Laughlin, Robert B. (2005). A Different Universe: Reinventing Physics from the Bottom Down. Basic Books. ISBN 978-0-465-03828-2. (Trad. esp.: Un universo diferente. La reinvención de la física en la Edad de la Emergencia, Buenos Aires/Madrid, Katz editores, 2007, ISBN 978-84-935432-9-7).
- Laughlin, Robert B. (2008). The Crime of Reason: And the Closing of the Scientific Mind. Basic Books. ISBN 978-0-465-00507-9. (Trad. esp.: Crímenes de la razón. El fin de la mentalidad científica, Buenos Aires/Madrid, Katz editores, 2010, ISBN 978-84-96859-68-5).
- Mente y materia. ¿Qué es la vida? Sobre la vigencia de Erwin Schrödinger (with Michael R. Hendrickson; Robert Pogue Harrison and Hans Ulrich Gumbrecht), Buenos Aires/Madrid, Katz editores, 2010, ISBN 978-84-92946-12-9.
- Laughlin, Robert B. (2013). Powering the Future: How We Will (Eventually) Solve the Energy Crisis and Fuel the Civilization of Tomorrow. Basic Books. ISBN 9780465022205.
