= James P. Eisenstein =

American physicist (born 1952)

- Born: May 15, 1952 (age 74); St. Louis, Missouri
- Education: Oberlin College; University of California, Berkeley
- Known for: Bose–Einstein condensate of excitons
- Awards: Oliver E. Buckley Condensed Matter Prize (2007); Wolf Prize in Physics (2025)
- Scientific career
- Fields: Physics
- Workplaces: Bell Laboratories; California Institute of Technology

James P. Eisenstein (born May 15, 1952) is an American physicist. He is currently the Frank J. Roshek Professor of Physics and Applied Physics, Emeritus, at the California Institute of Technology. He received a share of the 2025 Wolf Prize in Physics for his experimental research on strongly interacting two-dimensional electron systems. He co-discovered the 5/2 filling factor state of the fractional quantum Hall effect and demonstrated the Bose–Einstein condensation of excitons in two dimensions.

== Academic career ==
Eisenstein received his AB degree from Oberlin College in 1974 and a PhD in physics from the University of California, Berkeley in 1980. Following a few years as an assistant professor of physics at Williams College, Eisenstein became a member of the technical staff at Bell Laboratories at Murray Hill, New Jersey in 1983. In 1996 Eisenstein accepted a professorship in physics at the California Institute of Technology in Pasadena, California. In 2005, he became the Frank J. Roshek Professor of Physics and Applied Physics at Caltech. Eisenstein assumed emeritus status in 2018 and suspended his experimental research program in 2021.

He has served on various National Research Council committees including the Solid State Sciences Committee and the Board on Physics and Astronomy. He was an associate editor of the Annual Review of Condensed Matter Physics from 2014 to 2017.

== Research ==
Following doctoral research on the hydrodynamic properties of superfluid 3-He, at Bell Labs Eisenstein switched his focus to the experimental properties of two-dimensional electron systems in semiconductor heterostructures. At very low temperatures and high magnetic fields, such systems exhibit a host of exotic phenomena, notably the integer and fractional quantum Hall effects.

The even-denominator fractional quantum Hall state, at filling v=5/2, is believed to possess quasiparticles with non-abelian braiding statistics, a property key to proposed topological quantum computer architectures. Eisenstein co-discovered this state at filling factor 5/2, where the resistance depended on the direction, reminiscent of a liquid crystal. This discovery allowed him to study of the correlated motion of excitons in 2D, demonstrating their ability to form Bose–Einstein condensates. For these experiments, he shared the 2025 Wolf Prize in Physics with Jainendra K. Jain and Moty Heiblum.

The stripe and bubble phases reveal that in the quantum regime point-like electrons can organize themselves into configurations which resemble classical liquid crystals comprising complex asymmetric molecules.

Exciton condensation was originally theorized, in the 1960's, to occur in bulk semimetals in the absence of a magnetic field. Surprisingly, the phenomenon was first detected in closely-spaced double layer 2D electron systems at high magnetic field. In effect, at low temperature electrons in one layer can bind onto the vacancies between electrons in the other layer. The condensed phase has numerous exotic properties.

== Awards and honors ==
- 1992 Fellow of the American Physical Society
- 1993 Distinguished Member of the Technical Staff, Bell Laboratories
- 2003 Morris Loeb Lecturer, Harvard University
- 2005 Election to the U.S. National Academy of Sciences
- 2007 Oliver E. Buckley Prize of the American Physical Society, shared with Steven M. Girvin and Allan H. MacDonald. Citation reads "for fundamental experimental and theoretical research on correlated many-electron states in low dimensional systems."
- 2025 Wolf Prize in Physics, along with Mordehai Heiblum and Jainendra K. Jain for “advancing our understanding of the surprising properties of two-dimensional electron systems in strong magnetic fields.

== Publications ==
- Willett, R.; Eisenstein, J. P.; Störmer, H. L.; Tsui, D. C.; Gossard, A. C.; English, J. H. (1987-10-12). "Observation of an even-denominator quantum number in the fractional quantum Hall effect" (PDF). Physical Review Letters. 59 (15): 1776–1779. Bibcode:1987PhRvL..59.1776W. doi:10.1103/physrevlett.59.1776. ISSN 0031-9007. PMID 10035326.
- Lilly, M. P.; Cooper, K. B.; Eisenstein, J. P.; Pfeiffer, L. N.; West, K. W. (1999-01-11). "Evidence for an Anisotropic State of Two-Dimensional Electrons in High Landau Levels" (PDF). Physical Review Letters. 82 (2): 394–397. arXiv:cond-mat/9808227. Bibcode:1999PhRvL..82..394L. doi:10.1103/physrevlett.82.394. ISSN 0031-9007. S2CID 17531735.
- Eisenstein, J. P.; MacDonald, A. H. (2004). "Bose–Einstein condensation of excitons in bilayer electron systems". Nature. 432 (7018): 691–694. arXiv:cond-mat/0404113. Bibcode:2004Natur.432..691E. doi:10.1038/nature03081. ISSN 0028-0836. PMID 15592403. S2CID 1538354.
- Eisenstein, J. P. (2014). "Exciton Condensation in Bilayer Quantum Hall Systems". Annual Review of Condensed Matter Physics. 5: 159–181. arXiv:1306.0584. Bibcode:2014ARCMP...5..159E. doi:10.1146/annurev-conmatphys-031113-133832.
