= A Different Universe =

Book by Robert Betts Laughlin

A Different Universe: Reinventing Physics from the Bottom Down
- First edition cover
- Author: Robert B. Laughlin
- Language: English
- Publisher: Basic Books
- Publication date: March 01, 2005
- Publication place: United States
- Media type: Print (Hardback & Paperback)
- Pages: 272 pages
- ISBN: 978-0465038282 (reissue)

A Different Universe: Reinventing Physics from the Bottom Down is a 2005 physics book by Robert B. Laughlin, a winner of the Nobel Prize in Physics for the fractional quantum Hall effect. Its title is a play on the P. W. Anderson manifesto More is Different (historically important in claiming that condensed-matter physics deserves greater respect). The book extends his articles "The Middle Way" and "The Theory of Everything", arguing the limits of reductionism. A key concept in Laughlin's works is protectorates, meaning robust physical regimes of behavior that do not depend on (that is, they are protected from the fickle details of) the underlying smaller-scale physics such as quantum noise. Such robust or reliable behavior at macroscopic scales makes possible higher-level entities, from biological life to nanotechnology. The book emphasizes more study of such macroscopic phenomena, sometimes called emergence, over the ever-downward dive into theoretically fundamental ideas such as string theory, which at some point become empirically irrelevant by having no observable consequences in our world. The arguments come full circle with modern dark energy ideas suggesting that spacetime or the vacuum may not be empty, but rather (for all we can observe) a medium, a possibility ironically glimpsed even by Einstein whose career began with demolishing the similar but too-simplistic notion of ether with his special relativity work.

== Reception ==
Keay Davidson reviewed the book for the New York Times, saying that "Laughlin's thesis is intriguing, if not completely persuasive." Carlos Lourenço, reviewing the book for the CERN Courier, found it "thought-provoking" and "worth reading", though he was left disappointed by the time it spent on seemingly irrelevant topics and polemics against reductionists. Lourenço concludes that "there is a lot of talking but in the end not much physics really gets reinvented."
