= Nicholas Read =

American physicist (born 1958)

Nicholas Read FRS
- Born: November 22, 1958 (age 67); London, England
- Citizenship: United States
- Education: Imperial College London; Cambridge University
- Known for: Composite fermion model for quantum Hall systems Moore–Read state Hall viscosity Majorana zero modes in condensed matter
- Awards: Alfred P. Sloan Research Fellowship; NSF Presidential Young Investigator Award; Oliver E. Buckley Condensed Matter Prize (2002); Dirac Medal (2015); FRS (2020)
- Scientific career
- Fields: Condensed matter theory
- Workplaces: Yale University
- Doctoral advisor: Dennis M. Newns

Nicholas Read FRS (born November 22, 1958) is a British-born American physicist, noted for his work on strongly interacting quantum many-body systems, particularly topological phases of matter and the fractional quantum Hall effect.

== Biography ==
Read was born in London, England on November 22, 1958. He was educated at Langley Park School for Boys in Beckenham and completed his undergraduate education at Sidney Sussex College, Cambridge, where he graduated with a BA in Mathematics in 1980 and a Certificate of Advanced Study in Mathematics the following year. He completed his PhD at Imperial College London in 1986, after which he moved to the United States. Read worked as a post-doctoral researcher, first at Brown University, and then at the Massachusetts Institute of Technology. He joined Yale University as an assistant professor in 1988, and was promoted to professor of physics and applied physics in 1995. In 2012, he was appointed Henry Ford II Professor of Physics. He also holds appointments as Professor of Applied Physics and Professor of Mathematics, and is a member of the Yale Quantum Institute.

== Research ==
Read's early work concerned the properties of rare-earth "heavy-fermion" compounds, for which he developed a 1/N expansion method using gauge-theory techniques to treat the strongly interacting Kondo and heavy fermion models as constrained systems.

=== Fractional quantum Hall effect ===
Read is best known for his work on the fractional quantum Hall effect. Together with Greg Moore, he proposed the Moore–Read state, a Pfaffian trial wavefunction for the quantum Hall plateau at filling fraction 5/2 that supports quasiparticle excitations obeying non-Abelian braiding statistics. Such excitations could in principle be used for topological quantum computation, storing quantum information non-locally and thereby achieving robustness against decoherence. With B. I. Halperin and P. A. Lee, Read developed the HLR theory, a Chern–Simons gauge theory of composite fermion Fermi liquid states at filling fraction ν = 1/2, which successfully explained a number of experimental puzzles in half-filled Landau levels. Read was awarded the 2002 Oliver E. Buckley Condensed Matter Prize together with Jainendra Jain and Robert Willet "For theoretical and experimental work establishing the composite fermion model for the half-filled Landau level and other quantized Hall systems".

With Edward Rezayi, Read extended the theory to construct a series of non-Abelian quantum Hall states based on parafermions in the first excited Landau level.

=== Majorana zero modes and paired superfluids ===
With Dmitry Green, Read showed that p-wave (p_{x} + ip_{y}) paired superfluids in two dimensions support Majorana zero modes bound to vortex cores, connecting the physics of paired superfluids to the non-Abelian statistics of the Moore–Read quantum Hall state.

=== Hall viscosity ===
Read introduced the concept of Hall viscosity, a non-dissipative transport coefficient analogous to the Hall conductivity, and showed that it is quantized in gapped or topological phases of quantum fluids, being related to the mean orbital spin per particle.

=== Other contributions ===
Using gauge-theory and large-N methods applied to quantum antiferromagnets, Read showed that phases without Néel order can be understood as topological phases, including spin-Peierls states and featureless spin-liquid resonating valence bond states that are essentially equivalent to the toric code. In conformal field theory, Read obtained exact results on irrational CFTs arising from loop models, particularly for percolation and the spin quantum Hall transition. He has also contributed to the understanding of replica symmetry breaking in short-range spin glasses.

== Honours and awards ==
- Alfred P. Sloan Research Fellowship
- NSF Presidential Young Investigator Award
- Shared the 2002 Oliver E. Buckley Condensed Matter Prize
- Fellow of the American Physical Society
- Fellow of the American Academy of Arts and Sciences
- Shared the 2015 Dirac Medal of ICTP
- Member of the National Academy of Sciences (elected 2017)
- Member of the Connecticut Academy of Science and Engineering (elected 2018)
- Elected a Fellow of the Royal Society (FRS) in 2020
