= John Roy Whinnery =

American electrical engineer and educator

- John Whinnery was dean of Berkeley from 1959 to 1963
- Born: July 26, 1916; Read, Colorado, U.S.
- Died: February 1, 2009 (aged 92); Walnut Creek, California, U.S.
- Awards: IEEE Medal of Honor (1985); National Medal of Science (1992)
- Scientific career
- Fields: Electrical engineering
- Doctoral students: Chenming Hu; Moty Heiblum

John Roy Whinnery (July 26, 1916 – February 1, 2009) was an American electrical engineer and educator who worked in the fields of microwave theory and laser experimentation.

== Biography ==
Whinnery received the B.S. degree in Electrical Engineering from the University of California, Berkeley, in 1937, and the Ph.D. from the same institution in 1948. Throughout World War II, he was active in war training classes, held a part-time lectureship at Union College(1945–46), and earned his doctoral degree while working 6 days a week in microwaves at General Electric, Schenectady, New York, working on problems in waveguide discontinuities, microwave tubes, and applications to radar. He continued his career working on He-Ne laser modulation, the transmission of laser light for optical communication and photo thermal effects. His research evolved to include quantum electronics and opto-electronics as well.

Whinnery was on the faculty of the University of California, Berkeley, beginning in 1946, holding appointment as lecturer, associate professor, and professor. From 1952 to 1956, he directed the Electronics Research Laboratory; from 1956 to 1959, he was chairman of the Electric Engineering Department; from 1959 to 1963, he was dean of the College of Engineering at Berkeley. During Whinnery's terms, many of the most successful young faculty were hired to the College of Engineering, Berkeley, specifically in Electrical Engineering, contributing significantly to Berkeley's reputation as one of the premier colleges of engineering in the world today.

John Whinnery was a Fellow of the IEEE and of the Optical Society of America, a member of the National Academy of Engineering, the National Academy of Sciences, and the American Academy of Arts and Sciences. He received the IEEE Education Medal and Microwave Career Award of the IEEE, as well as the Lamme Medal of the American Society for Engineering Education. In 1980 he was appointed University Professor at the University of California. On leave from the University, he acted as head of the Microwave Tube Research Section of the Hughes Aircraft Company (1951–52), engaged in research in quantum electronics at the Bell Laboratories, Inc., Murray Hill, New Jersey (1963–64) and held Visiting Professorship at the University of California, Santa Cruz and Stanford University. In 1959 he held a Guggenheim Fellowship at the ETH Zurich, Switzerland. In 1985 he was awarded the IEEE Medal of Honor "For seminal contributions to the understanding and application of electromagnetic fields and waves to microwave, laser, and optical devices" and in 1992 he received the National Medal of Science.

He also served on the board of trustees of Science Service, now known as Society for Science & the Public, from 1967 to 1971.

== Publications ==
- "Fields and Waves in Communication Electronics," Simon Ramo, John R. Whinnery, Theodore Van Duzer, 3rd edition, 1994 ISBN 9780471585510
- "Lasers: Invention to Application," John R. Whinnery, Jesse H. Ausubel (eds.), 1987 ISBN 0309594715
- The World of Engineering, John R. Whinnery (ed.), 1965

== Selected honors and awards ==
- IEEE Fellow (1952)
- John Simon Guggenheim Fellowship (1959)
- National Academy of Engineering (1965)
- IEEE Education Medal (1967)
- National Academy of Sciences Member (1972)
- ASEE Lamme Medal (1974)
- IEEE MTTS Microwave Career Award (1976)
- Optical Society of America Fellow (1978)
- American Academy of Arts and Sciences Fellow (1980)
- UC Berkeley Engineering Alumni Society Distinguished Alumni Award (1980)
- IEEE Life Member (1982)
- IEEE MTTS Centennial Medal Award (1984)
- IEEE Medal of Honor (1985)
- NAE Founders Award (1986)
- American Association for the Advancement of Sciences Life Member (1988)
- National Medal of Science (1992)
- Okawa Prize (1997)

== See also ==
- List of textbooks in electromagnetism
