= Amir Yacoby =

Israeli physicist (PhD in 1994)

- Education: Weizmann Institute of Science
- Scientific career
- Fields: Condensed matter physics
- Workplaces: Harvard University; University of Waterloo
- Academic advisors: Mordehai Heiblum

Amir Yacoby is a condensed matter physicist and professor at Harvard University.

His work is focused on investigation techniques for quantum matter, such as quantum sensing with quantum dots and color centers (see Nitrogen-vacancy center), and on quantum computing.

== Education ==
Yacoby got bachelor’s degree in aeronautical engineering and a master’s degree in theoretical physics. In 1994, he obtained his PhD at Weizmann Institute of Science under the supervision of Professor Moty Heiblum.

== Career ==
In 2006, Yacoby started teaching at Harvard. He was appointed as the Lazaridis Chair in Physics of the Institute for Quantum Computing in 2013. In March 2014, his group developed a magnetic resonance imaging technology by which nanoscale images can be provided, that could enable researchers to peer into the atomic structure of individual molecules. In 2014, Yacoby was named a Fellow of the American Association for the Advancement of Science.

Amir Yacoby is co-founder of the start-up Quantum Elements, which was founded in 2023 in Los Angeles. It is offering a "quantum development software stack" for simulation of quantum computing hardware.

In September 2026, it was announced that Yacoby would be appointed as inaugural "Ray Dolby Professor of Theoretical and Experimental Physics" at the Cavendish Laboratory at the University of Cambridge.
