= Electron quadruplets =

The condensate of electron quadruplets is a proposed state of matter in which Cooper pairs do not exhibit long-range order, but electron quadruplets do. Such states emerge in systems with multiple broken symmetries due to the partial melting of the underlying low-temperature order, which destroys the condensates of Cooper pairs but preserves the condensates formed by pairs of preformed fermion pairs. One example of the proposed electron quadruplet condensates is charge-4e Another example is "quartic metal" phase is distinct from those superconductors explained by the standard BCS theory; rather than expelling magnetic field lines as in the Meissner effect, it generates them, a spontaneous Nernst effect that indicates the breaking of time-reversal symmetry.

Related states can form in pair-density-wave systems. In systems with a greater number of broken symmetries, theoretical studies have demonstrated the existence of charge-6e and more complex orders. After the theoretical possibility was raised, observations consistent with electron quadrupling were published using hole-doped Ba_{1-x}K_{x}Fe_{2}As_{2} in 2021, with claims of charge-4e state reported in mesoscopic samples of CsV_{3}Sb_{5} soon after, in early 2022.

== See also ==
- List of states of matter
