= Spin gapless semiconductor =

Class of materials

Spin gapless semiconductors are a class of materials in which the spin-averaged electronic band structure has no band gap, while the two spin channels are asymmetrical. This asymmetry can be realized in various ways. For example, one spin channel may exhibit a gapless Dirac-like dispersion, while the other has a finite band gap. In addition to Dirac or linear SGSs, the other major category of SGS are parabolic spin gapless semiconductors.

In a spin gapless semiconductor, The conduction and valence band edges touch, so that no threshold energy is required to move electrons from occupied (valence) states to empty (conduction) states. This makes the band structures of spin-gapless semiconductors extremely sensitive to external influences (e.g., pressure or magnetic field).

Because very little energy is needed to excite electrons in an SGS, charge concentrations are very easily tunable by doping or by application of a magnetic or electric field (gating). Electron mobility in such materials is two to four orders of magnitude higher than in classical semiconductors.

A new type of SGS identified in 2017, known as Dirac-type linear spin-gapless semiconductors, has linear dispersion and is considered an ideal platform for massless and dissipationless spintronics because spin-orbital coupling opens a gap for the spin fully polarized conduction and valence band, and as a result, the interior of the sample becomes an insulator, however, an electrical current can flow without resistance at the sample edge. This effect, the quantum anomalous Hall effect has only previously been realised in magnetically doped topological insulators.

A convergence of topology and magnetism known as Chern magnetism makes SGSs ideal candidate materials for realizing room-temperature quantum anomalous Hall effect (QAHE).

SGSs are topologically non-trivial.

== Prediction and discovery ==
The spin gapless semiconductor was first proposed as a new spintronics concept and a new class of candidate spintronic materials in 2008 in a paper by Xiaolin Wang of the University of Wollongong in Australia.

== Properties and applications ==
The dependence of bandgap on spin direction leads to high carrier-spin-polarization, and offers promising spin-controlled electronic and magnetic properties for spintronics applications.

The spin gapless semiconductor is a promising candidate material for spintronics because its charged particles can be fully spin-polarised, so that spin can be controlled via only a small applied external energy.
