= Fractional quantum Hall effect =

Electromagnetic effect in physics

The fractional quantum Hall effect (fractional QHE or FQHE) is the observation of precisely quantized plateaus in the Hall conductance of 2-dimensional (2D) electrons at fractional values of $e^2/h$, where e is the electron charge and h is the Planck constant. At the same time, longitudinal resistance drops to zero (for low enough temperatures) as for the integer QHE. It is a property of a collective state in which electrons bind magnetic flux lines to make new quasiparticles, and excitations have a fractional elementary charge and possibly also fractional statistics. The 1998 Nobel Prize in Physics was awarded to Robert Laughlin, Horst Störmer, and Daniel Tsui "for their discovery of a new form of quantum fluid with fractionally charged excitations". The microscopic origin of the FQHE is a major research topic in condensed matter physics.

== Descriptions ==
Unsolved problem in physics
What mechanism explains the existence of the ν=5/2 state in the fractional quantum Hall effect?
More unsolved problems in physics

The fractional quantum Hall effect (FQHE) is a collective behavior in a 2D system of electrons. In particular magnetic fields, the electron gas condenses into a remarkable liquid state, which is very delicate, requiring high quality material with a low carrier concentration, and extremely low temperatures. As in the integer quantum Hall effect, the Hall resistance undergoes certain quantum Hall transitions to form a series of plateaus. Each particular value of the magnetic field corresponds to a filling factor (the ratio of number of electrons to magnetic flux quanta corresponding to given area)

$$\nu = p/q,\$$

where p and q are integers with no common factors. Here q turns out to be an odd number with the exception of filling factor 5/2 and few others (7/2 or 2+3/8). The principal series of such fractions are

$${1\over 3}, {2\over 5}, {3\over 7}, \mbox{etc.,}$$

and their particle-hole conjugates

$${2\over3}, {3\over 5}, {4\over 7}, \mbox{etc.}$$

Depending on the fraction, both spin-polarised and zero-spin fractional QHE states may exist. Fractionally charged quasiparticles are neither bosons nor fermions and exhibit anyonic statistics. The fractional quantum Hall effect continues to be influential in theories about topological order. Certain fractional quantum Hall phases appear to have the right properties for building a topological quantum computer.

== History and developments ==
The FQHE was experimentally discovered in 1982 by Daniel Tsui and Horst Störmer, in experiments performed on heterostructures made out of gallium arsenide developed by Arthur Gossard.

There were several major steps in the theory of the FQHE.

- Laughlin states and fractionally-charged quasiparticles: this theory, proposed by Robert B. Laughlin, is based on accurate trial wave functions for the ground state at fraction $1/q$ as well as its quasiparticle and quasihole excitations. The excitations have fractional charge of magnitude $e^*={e\over q}$.
- Fractional exchange statistics of quasiparticles: Bertrand Halperin conjectured, and Daniel Arovas, John Robert Schrieffer, and Frank Wilczek demonstrated, that the fractionally charged quasiparticle excitations of the Laughlin states are anyons with fractional statistical angle $\theta = {\pi \over q}$; the wave function acquires phase factor of $e^{i \theta}$ (together with an Aharonov-Bohm phase factor) when identical quasiparticles are exchanged in a counterclockwise sense. A recent experiment seems to give a clear demonstration of this effect.
- Hierarchy states: this theory was proposed by Duncan Haldane, and further clarified by Bertrand Halperin, to explain the observed filling fractions not occurring at the Laughlin states' $\nu = 1/q$. Starting with the Laughlin states, new states at different fillings can be formed by condensing quasiparticles into their own Laughlin states. The new states and their fillings are constrained by the fractional statistics of the quasiparticles, producing e.g. $\nu = 2/5$ and $2/7$ states from the Laughlin $\nu = 1/3$ state. Similarly constructing another set of new states by condensing quasiparticles of the first set of new states, and so on, produces a hierarchy of states covering all the odd-denominator filling fractions. This idea has been validated quantitatively, and brings out the observed fractions in a natural order. Laughlin's original plasma model was extended to the hierarchy states by Allan H. MacDonald and others. Using methods introduced by Greg Moore and Nicholas Read, based on conformal field theory explicit wave functions can be constructed for all hierarchy states.
- Composite fermions: this theory was proposed by Jainendra K. Jain, and further extended by Halperin, Patrick A. Lee and Read. The basic idea of this theory is that as a result of the repulsive interactions, two (or, in general, an even number of) vortices are captured by each electron, forming integer-charged quasiparticles called composite fermions. The fractional states of the electrons are understood as the integer QHE of composite fermions. For example, this makes electrons at filling factors 1/3, 2/5, 3/7, etc. behave in the same way as at filling factor 1, 2, 3, etc. Composite fermions have been observed, and the theory has been verified by experiment and computer calculations. Composite fermions are valid even beyond the fractional quantum Hall effect; for example, the filling factor 1/2 corresponds to zero magnetic field for composite fermions, resulting in their Fermi sea.

Daniel Tsui， Horst Störmer, and Robert B. Laughlin were awarded the 1998 Nobel Prize in Physics for their work.

Jainendra K. Jain, James P. Eisenstein, and Mordehai Heiblum won the 2025 Wolf Prize in Physics "for advancing our understanding of the surprising properties of two-dimensional electron systems in strong magnetic fields".

== Evidence for fractionally-charged quasiparticles ==
Experiments have reported results that specifically support the understanding that there are fractionally-charged quasiparticles in an electron gas under FQHE conditions.

In 1995, the fractional charge of Laughlin quasiparticles was measured directly in a quantum antidot electrometer at Stony Brook University, New York. In 1997, two groups of physicists at the Weizmann Institute of Science in Rehovot, Israel, and at the Commissariat à l'énergie atomique laboratory near Paris, detected such quasiparticles carrying an electric current, through measuring quantum shot noise Both of these experiments have been confirmed with certainty.

A more recent experiment measures the quasiparticle charge. In 2020, interferometry experiments conducted by two different groups, at Paris and Purdue, were both able to probe and confirm the braiding statistics of Abelian anyons.

== Impact ==
The FQH effect shows the limits of Landau's symmetry breaking theory. Previously it was held that the symmetry breaking theory could explain all the important concepts and properties of forms of matter. According to this view, the only thing to be done was to apply the symmetry breaking theory to all different kinds of phases and phase transitions. From this perspective, the importance of the FQHE discovered by Tsui, Stormer, and Gossard is notable for contesting old perspectives.

The existence of FQH liquids suggests that there is much more to discover beyond the present symmetry breaking paradigm in condensed matter physics. Different FQH states all have the same symmetry and cannot be described by symmetry breaking theory. The associated fractional charge, fractional statistics, non-Abelian statistics, chiral edge states, etc. demonstrate the power and the fascination of emergence in many-body systems. Thus FQH states represent new states of matter that contain a completely new kind of order—topological order. For example, properties once deemed isotropic for all materials may be anisotropic in 2D planes. The new type of orders represented by FQH states greatly enrich our understanding of quantum phases and quantum phase transitions.

== See also ==
- Hall probe
- Laughlin wavefunction
- Macroscopic quantum phenomena
- Quantum anomalous Hall effect
- Quantum Hall Effect
- Quantum spin Hall effect
- Topological order
- Fractional Chern insulator
