= Composite fermion =

Quasiparticle in the fractional quantum Hall effect

Composite fermions are electrons dressed with an even number of quantum vortices, often pictured as electrons dressed with an even number of magnetic flux quanta. They were introduced by Jainendra K. Jain in 1989, who co-received the Wolf Prize in Physics in 2025 for this contribution. Composite fermions provide a unifying theoretical framework for understanding the variety of strongly correlated quantum phases that occur when two-dimensional electron systems are subjected to strong magnetic fields.

The binding of magnetic flux quanta results in an effective reduction of the magnetic field experienced by the composite fermions, which has led to numerous groundbreaking predictions. An important prediction is fractional quantum Hall effect (FQHE) of electrons at $\nu=\frac{n}{2pn\pm 1}$, known as the Jain sequences, which represent the integer quantum Hall effect of composite fermions. Subsequent experiments have shown these fractions to be the prominently observed odd-denominator fractions. Fermi-liquid–like metallic states of composite fermions were predicted at even-denominator filling factors like $\nu=1/2, 1/4$ by Bertrand Halperin, Patrick Lee and Nicholas Read, where composite fermions do not see any magnetic field. This explained why no FQHE is seen here, and was confirmed in many remarkable experiments that measure the Fermi wave vector, cyclotron orbits, etc. Just as a Fermi liquid serves as the parent state for Cooper pairing and superconductivity, the Fermi liquid of composite fermions can produce paired, superconductor-like states of composite fermions at some even-denominator fractions which results in a FQHE, as theorized by Gregory Moore and Read for 5/2 A dramatic consequence of such a state are non-Abelian quasiparticles, which are supported by thermal Hall experiments. Crystals and stripe-ordered phases of composite fermions were also predicted under some conditions and find experimental support.

A wide range of experimental observations, including activation energy gaps, transport measurements, geometric resonance experiments, and spectroscopic probes, are readily understood in terms of composite fermions. The composite-fermion theory has been extended to make detailed predictions for spin and valley polarizations of the fractional quantum Hall states and for new states in bilayers, and continues to influence research on quantum Hall systems and related phenomena in condensed-matter physics.

Jain constructed quantum mechanical wave functions for composite fermions, which have been demonstrated to be extremely accurate and have led to quantitative predictions and confirmations of the theory. A field-theoretic treatment of composite fermions through a Chern–Simons theory was developed by Ana María López and Eduardo Fradkin, and independently by Bertrand Halperin, Nicholas Read, Patrick A. Lee, many predictions of which have been borne out by subsequent experiments.

Composite fermions also occur at zero magnetic field in twisted semiconductor bilayers or multilayer graphene, as evidenced by the appearance of the Jain sequences in these systems.

== Description ==
When electrons are confined to two dimensions, cooled to very low temperatures, and subjected to a strong magnetic field, their kinetic energy is quenched due to Landau level quantization. Their behavior under such conditions is governed by the Coulomb repulsion alone, and they produce a strongly correlated quantum liquid. Experiments have shown that electrons minimize their interaction by capturing quantized vortices to become composite fermions. The interaction between composite fermions themselves is often negligible to a good approximation, which makes them the physical quasiparticles of this quantum liquid.

The signature quality of composite fermions, which is responsible for the otherwise unexpected behavior of this system, is that they experience a much smaller magnetic field than electrons. The magnetic field seen by composite fermions is given by

$$B^*=B-2p \rho \phi_0,$$

where $B$ is the external magnetic field, $2p$ is the number of vortices bound to composite fermion (also called the vorticity or the vortex charge of the composite fermion), $\rho$ is the particle density in two dimensions, and $\phi_0=hc/e$ is called the "flux quantum" (which differs from the superconducting flux quantum by a factor of two). The effective magnetic field is a direct manifestation of the existence of composite fermions, and also embodies a fundamental distinction between electrons and composite fermions.

Sometimes it is said that electrons "capture" or "swallow" $2p$ flux quanta each to transform into composite fermions, which are pictorially depicted as electrons carrying flux quanta, and the composite fermions then experience the residual magnetic field $B^*.$ More accurately, the vortices bound to electrons produce their own geometric phases which partly cancel the Aharonov–Bohm phase due to the external magnetic field to generate a net geometric phase that can be modeled as an Aharonov–Bohm phase in an effective magnetic field $B^*.$

The behavior of composite fermions is similar to that of electrons in an effective magnetic field $B^*.$ Electrons form Landau levels in a magnetic field, and the number of filled Landau levels is called the filling factor, given by the expression $\nu=\rho \phi_0/B.$ Composite fermions form Landau-like levels in the effective magnetic field $B^*,$ which are called composite fermion Landau levels or $\Lambda$ levels. One defines the filling factor for composite fermions as $\nu^*=\rho \phi_0/|B^*|.$ This gives the following relation between the electron and composite fermion filling factors

$$\nu=\frac{\nu^*}{2p\nu^*\pm 1}.$$

The minus sign occurs when the effective magnetic field is antiparallel to the applied magnetic field, which happens when the geometric phase from the vortices overcompensate the Aharonov–Bohm phase.

== Experimental manifestations ==
The central statement of composite fermion theory is that the strongly correlated electrons at a magnetic field $B$ (or filling factor $\nu$) turn into weakly interacting composite fermions at a magnetic field $B^*$ (or composite fermion filling factor $\nu^*$). This allows an effectively single-particle explanation of the otherwise complex many-body behavior, with the interaction between electrons manifesting as an effective kinetic energy of composite fermions. Here are some of the phenomena arising from composite fermions:

=== Fermi sea ===
The effective magnetic field for composite fermions vanishes for $B=2p\rho\phi_0$, where the filling factor for electrons is $\nu=1/2p$. Here, composite fermions were predicted to make a Fermi sea. This Fermi sea has been observed at half filled Landau level in numerous experiments, which also measure the Fermi wave vector.

=== Cyclotron orbits ===
As the magnetic field is moved slightly away from $B^*=0$, composite fermions execute semiclassical cyclotron orbits. These have been observed by coupling to surface acoustic waves, resonance peaks in antidot superlattice, and magnetic focusing. The radius of the cyclotron orbits is consistent with the effective magnetic field $B^*=0$ and is sometimes an order of magnitude or more larger than the radius of the cyclotron orbit of an electron at the externally applied magnetic field $B$. Also, the observed direction of trajectory is opposite to that of electrons when $B^*$ is anti-parallel to $B$.

=== Cyclotron resonance ===
In addition to the cyclotron orbits, cyclotron resonance of composite fermions has also been observed by photoluminescence.

=== Shubnikov–de Haas oscillations ===
As the magnetic field is moved further away from $B^*=0$, quantum oscillations are observed that are periodic in $1/B^*.$ These are Shubnikov–de Haas oscillations of composite fermions. These oscillations arise from the quantization of the semiclassical cyclotron orbits of composite fermions into composite fermion Landau levels. From the analysis of the Shubnikov–de Haas experiments, one can deduce the effective mass and the quantum lifetime of composite fermions.

=== Integer quantum Hall effect ===
With further increase in $|B^*|$ or decrease in temperature and disorder, composite fermions exhibit integer quantum Hall effect. The integer fillings of composite fermions, $\nu^*=n$, correspond to the electrons fillings

$$\nu=\frac{n}{2pn\pm 1}.$$

Combined with

$$\nu=1-\frac{n}{2pn\pm 1},$$

which are obtained by attaching vortices to holes in the lowest Landau level, these constitute the prominently observed sequences of fractions, known as Jain sequences. Examples are

$${n\over 2n+1}={1\over 3},\, {2\over 5},\, {3\over 7},\, {4\over 9},\,{5\over 11},\cdots$$
$${n\over 2n-1}={2\over 3},\, {3\over 5},\, {4\over 7},\, {5\over 9},\,{6\over 11},\cdots$$
$${n\over 4n+1}={1\over 5},\, {2\over 9},\, {3\over 13},\, {4\over 17},\cdots$$

The fractional quantum Hall effect of electrons is thus explained as the integer quantum Hall effect of composite fermions. It results in fractionally quantized Hall plateaus at

$$R_H={h\over \nu e^2},$$

with $\nu$ given by above quantized values. These sequences terminate at the composite fermion Fermi sea. Note that the fractions have odd denominators, which follows from the even vorticity of composite fermions.

=== Fractional quantum Hall effect ===
The above sequences account for most, but not all, observed fractions. Other fractions have been observed, which arise from a weak residual interaction between composite fermions, and are thus more delicate. A number of these are understood as fractional quantum Hall effect of composite fermions. For example, the fractional quantum Hall effect of composite fermions at $\nu^*=4/3$ produces the fraction 4/11, which does not belong to the primary sequences.

=== Superconductivity ===
An even denominator fraction, $\nu=5/2,$ has been observed. Here the second Landau level is half full, but the state cannot be a Fermi sea of composite fermions, because the Fermi sea is gapless and does not show quantum Hall effect. This state is viewed as a "superconductor" of composite fermion, arising from a weak attractive interaction between composite fermions at this filling factor. The pairing of composite fermions opens a gap and produces a fractional quantum Hall effect.

=== Excitons ===
The neutral excitations of various fractional quantum Hall states are excitons of composite fermions, that is, particle hole pairs of composite fermions. The energy dispersion of these excitons has been measured by light scattering and phonon scattering.

=== Spin ===
At high magnetic fields the spin of composite fermions is frozen, but it is observable at relatively low magnetic fields. The fan diagram of the composite fermion Landau levels has been determined by transport, and shows both spin-up and spin-down composite fermion Landau levels. The fractional quantum Hall states as well as composite fermion Fermi sea are also partially spin polarized for relatively low magnetic fields.

=== Effective magnetic field ===
The effective magnetic field of composite fermions has been confirmed by the similarity of the fractional and the integer quantum Hall effects, observation of Fermi sea at half filled Landau level, and measurements of the cyclotron radius.

=== Mass ===
The mass of composite fermions has been determined from the measurements of: the effective cyclotron energy of composite fermions; the temperature dependence of Shubnikov–de Haas oscillations; energy of the cyclotron resonance; spin polarization of the Fermi sea; and quantum phase transitions between states with different spin polarizations. Its typical value in GaAs systems is on the order of the electron mass in vacuum. (It is unrelated to the electron band mass in GaAs, which is 0.07 of the electron mass in vacuum.)

== Theoretical formulations ==
Much of the experimental phenomenology can be understood from the qualitative picture of composite fermions in an effective magnetic field. In addition, composite fermions also lead to a detailed and accurate microscopic theory of this quantum liquid. Two approaches have proved useful.

=== Trial wave functions ===
The following trial wave functions, also known as the Jain states, embody the composite fermion physics:

$\Psi^{\rm FQHE}_{\nu}=P\;\; \Psi^{\rm IQHE}_{\nu^*} \prod_{1\leq j<k\leq N}(z_j-z_k)^{2p}$

Here $\Psi^{\rm FQHE}_{\nu}$ is the wave function of interacting electrons at filling factor $\nu$; $\Psi^{\rm IQHE}_{\nu^*}$ is the wave function for weakly interacting electrons at $\nu^*$; $N$ is the number of electrons or composite fermions; $z_j=x_j+iy_j$ is the coordinate of the $j$th particle; and $P$ is an operator that projects the wave function into the lowest Landau level. This provides an explicit mapping between the integer and the fractional quantum Hall effects. Multiplication by $\prod_{j<k=1}^N(z_j-z_k)^{2p}$ attaches $2p$ vortices to each electron to convert it into a composite fermion. The right hand side is thus interpreted as describing composite fermions at filling factor $\nu^*$. The above mapping gives wave functions for both the ground and excited states of the fractional quantum Hall states in terms of the corresponding known wave functions for the integral quantum Hall states. The latter do not contain any adjustable parameters for $\nu^*=n$, so the FQHE wave functions do not contain any adjustable parameters at $\nu=n/(2pn\pm 1)$.

Comparisons with exact results show that these wave functions are quantitatively accurate. They can be used to compute a number of measurable quantities, such as the excitation gaps and exciton dispersions, the phase diagram of composite fermions with spin, the composite fermion mass, etc. For $\nu^*=1$ they reduce to the Laughlin wavefunction at fillings $\nu=1/(2p+1)$.

=== Chern–Simons field theory ===
Another formulation of the composite fermion physics is through a Chern–Simons field theory, wherein flux quanta are attached to electrons by a singular gauge transformation. At the mean field approximation the physics of free fermions in an effective field is recovered. Perturbation theory at the level of the random phase approximation captures many of the properties of composite fermions.

== See also ==
- Composite boson
- Integer quantum Hall effect
- Fractional quantum Hall effect
