= Fractional Chern insulator =

Lattice generalizations of the fractional quantum Hall effect

Fractional Chern insulators (FCIs) are lattice generalizations of the fractional quantum Hall effect that have been studied theoretically since 1993 and have been studied more intensely since early 2010. They were first predicted to exist in topological flat bands carrying Chern numbers. They can appear in topologically non-trivial band structures even in the absence of the large magnetic fields needed for the fractional quantum Hall effect. In principle, they can also occur in partially filled bands with trivial band structures if the inter-electron interaction is unusual. They promise physical realizations at lower magnetic fields, higher temperatures, and with shorter characteristic length scales compared to their continuum counterparts. FCIs were initially studied by adding electron-electron interactions to a fractionally filled Chern insulator, in one-body models where the Chern band is quasi-flat, at zero magnetic field. The FCIs exhibit a fractional quantized Hall conductance.

== Prior work and experiments with finite magnetic fields ==
In works predating the theoretical studies of FCIs, the analogue of the Laughlin state was demonstrated in Hofstadter-type models. The essential features of the topology of single-particle states in such models still stems from the presence of a magnetic field. Nevertheless, it was shown that in the presence of a lattice, fractional quantum Hall states can retain their topological character, in the form of fractional Chern numbers. Chern Insulators - single-particle states exhibiting an integer anomalous quantized Hall effect at zero field - have been theoretically proposed. Fractionally filling such states, in the presence of repulsive interactions, can lead to the zero-field Fractional Chern Insulator. These FCIs are sometimes not connected to the fractional quantum Hall effect in Landau levels. This is the case in bands with Chern number $|C|>1$, and are therefore a new type of states inherent to such lattice models. They have been explored with respect to their quasi-charge excitations, non-Abelian states and the physics of twist defects, which may be conceptually interesting for topological quantum computing.

Experimentally, $|C|>1$ Chern insulators have been realized without a magnetic field. FCIs have been claimed to be realized experimentally in van der Waals heterostructures, but with an external magnetic field of order 10 – 30 T and, more recently, FCIs in a $|C|=1$ band have been claimed to be observed in twisted bilayer graphene close to the magic angle, yet again requiring a magnetic field, of order 5 T in order to "smoothen" out the Berry curvature of the bands. These states have been called FCIs due to their link to lattice physics—either in Hofstadter bands or in the moiré structure, but still required nonzero-magnetic field for their stabilization.

== Zero field fractional Chern insulators ==
The prerequisite of zero field fractional Chern insulator is magnetism. The best way to have magnetism is to have exchange interaction that simultaneously polarize the spin. This phenomenon in twisted MoTe_{2} in both integer and fractional states was first observed by a University of Washington group. In 2023 a series of groups have reported FCIs at zero magnetic field in twisted MoTe_{2} samples. The University of Washington group first identified fractional Chern number of $\nu = -1$, $\nu = -2/3$ and $\nu = -3/5$ state with trion emission sensing. The fractional Chern insulators were independently discovered by the Cornell group who performed thermodynamic measurement on $\nu = -1$ and $\nu = -2/3$ state. These samples, where the moiré bands are valley-spin locked, undergo a spin-polarization transition which gives rise to a $C=1$ Chern insulator state at integer filling $-1$ of the moiré bands. Upon fractional filling at $-2/3$ and $-3/5$, a gapped state develops with a fractional slope in the Streda formula, a hallmark of an FCI. These fractional states are identical to the predicted zero magnetic field FCIs. After the optical sensing measurement, University of Washington group first reported transport `smoking-gun` evidence of fractional quantum anomalous Hall effect that should be exhibited by a zero-field fractional Chern insulator at $\nu = -1$, $\nu = -2/3$ and $\nu = -3/5$. They also identified a possible composite Fermi liquid at $\nu = -1/2$ that mimics the half filled Landau level for 2D electron gas. The $\nu = -1$ and $\nu = -2/3$ states are also partially repeated by the Shanghai group, while the $\nu = -2/3$ quantization is not as good. The full matching of FCI physics in MoTe_{2}, using the single particle model proposed in, to experiments still holds intriguing and unresolved mysteries. These were only partially theoretically addressed, where the issues of model parameters, sample magnetization, and the appearance of some FCI states (at filling $-2/3$ and $-3/5$) but the absence of others (so far at filling at $-1/3, -2/5$) are partially addressed.
