= Chain-melted state =

State of matter, between liquid and solid

The chain-melted state is a state of matter in which a substance, typically a metal, notably potassium, behaves both in the liquid and solid state at the same time. This is done by applying extreme pressure and temperature, causing the metal to become solid and molten simultaneously. It was confirmed to be a state of matter in 2019 by a group of researchers at the University of Edinburgh using artificial intelligence to analyse the results of subjecting potassium to high temperatures and pressure, when the potassium began exhibiting properties where it was apparently both solid and liquid. The phenomenon was observed by a group of other researchers in 2014; however, it was only thought to be a transitioning state. The chain-melted state has also been observed in other elements, such as sodium and rubidium. Some other elements, like bismuth, are also capable of being in the chain-melted state.

== Properties ==
Substances in the chain-melted state display properties of both a solid and a liquid. The co-author of a study regarding the chain-melted state, Andreas Hermann, stated that if the matter were hypothetically to be handled by a person, it would be like holding a wet sponge that is leaking water, while the sponge itself is actually made of water. Described more formally, the potassium metal developed two internal structures, a chain-like lattice that dissolved, and a stronger Bravais lattice that remained in a solid state. This is a type of host–guest chemistry where, in this case, the host lattice of metal atoms remains solid while some of the material binds weakly and resembles a liquid.

== Real world examples ==
Metals in Earth's inner core could possibly be in the chain-melted state, as suggested by several simulations, where metals such as titanium and iron displayed partially molten states, or quasi-solid properties. It is also possible that Earth's mantle may contain metals like potassium in the chain-melted state; however, potassium is usually not found in pure form.

These suggestions may also possibly be proven by the Kola superdeep borehole, where according to declassified documents, the rock at the bottom of the borehole was found to be in a texture between solid and liquid.

== Applications ==
No applications have been found thus far, although physicist Andreas Hermann states that if the state of matter could be recreated in other materials, it could have many different applications.
