= Quantum Hall transitions =

Phase transitions in the Hall effect

Quantum Hall transitions are the quantum phase transitions that occur between different robustly quantized electronic phases of the quantum Hall effect. The robust quantization of these electronic phases is due to strong localization of electrons in their disordered, two-dimensional potential. But, at the quantum Hall transition, the electron gas delocalizes as can be observed in the laboratory. This phenomenon is understood in the language of topological field theory. Here, a vacuum angle (or 'theta angle') distinguishes between topologically different sectors in the vacuum. These topological sectors correspond to the robustly quantized phases. The quantum Hall transitions can then be understood by looking at the topological excitations (instantons) that occur between those phases.

== Historical perspective ==
Just after the first measurements on the quantum Hall effect in 1980, physicists wondered how the strongly localized electrons in the disordered potential were able to delocalize at their phase transitions. At that time, the field theory of Anderson localization didn't yet include a topological angle and hence it predicted that: "for any given amount of disorder, all states in two dimensions are localized". A result that was irreconcilable with the observations on delocalization. Without knowing the solution to this problem, physicists resorted to a semi-classical picture of localized electrons that, given a certain energy, were able to percolate through the disorder. This percolation mechanism was what assumed to delocalize the electrons

As a result of this semi-classical idea, many numerical computations were done based on the percolation picture. On top of the classical percolation phase transition, quantum tunneling was included in computer simulations to calculate the critical exponent of the `semi-classical percolation phase transition'. To compare this result with the measured critical exponent, the Fermi-liquid approximation was used, where the Coulomb interactions between electrons are assumed to be finite. Under this assumption, the ground state of the free electron gas can be adiabatically transformed into the ground state of the interacting system and this gives rise to an inelastic scattering length so that the canonical correlation length exponent can be compared to the measured critical exponent.

But, at the quantum phase transition, the localization lengths of the electrons becomes infinite (i.e. they delocalize) and this compromises the Fermi-liquid assumption of an inherently free electron gas (where individual electrons must be well-distinguished). The quantum Hall transition will therefore not be in the Fermi-liquid universality class, but in the 'F-invariant' universality class that has a different value for the critical exponent. The semi-classical percolation picture of the quantum Hall transition is therefore outdated (although still widely used) and we need to understand the delocalization mechanism as an instanton effect.

== Disorder in the sample ==
The random disorder in the potential landscape of the two-dimensional electron gas plays a key role in the observation of topological sectors and their instantons (phase transitions). Because of the disorder, the electrons are localized and thus they cannot flow across the sample. But if we consider a loop around a localized 2D electron, we can notice that current is still able to flow in the direction around this loop. This current is able to renormalize to larger scales and eventually becomes the Hall current that rotates along the edge of the sample. A topological sector corresponds to an integer number of rotations and it is now visible macroscopically, in the robustly quantized behavior of the measurable Hall current. If the electrons were not sufficiently localized, this measurement would be blurred out by the usual flow of current through the sample.

For the subtle observations on phase transitions it is important that the disorder is of the right kind. The random nature of the potential landscape should be apparent on a scale sufficiently smaller than the sample size in order to clearly distinguish the different phases of the system. These phases are only observable by the principle of emergence, so the difference between self-similar scales has to be multiple orders of magnitude for the critical exponent to be well-defined. On the opposite side, when the disorder correlation length is too small, the states are not sufficiently localized to observe them delocalize.

== Renormalization group flow diagram ==
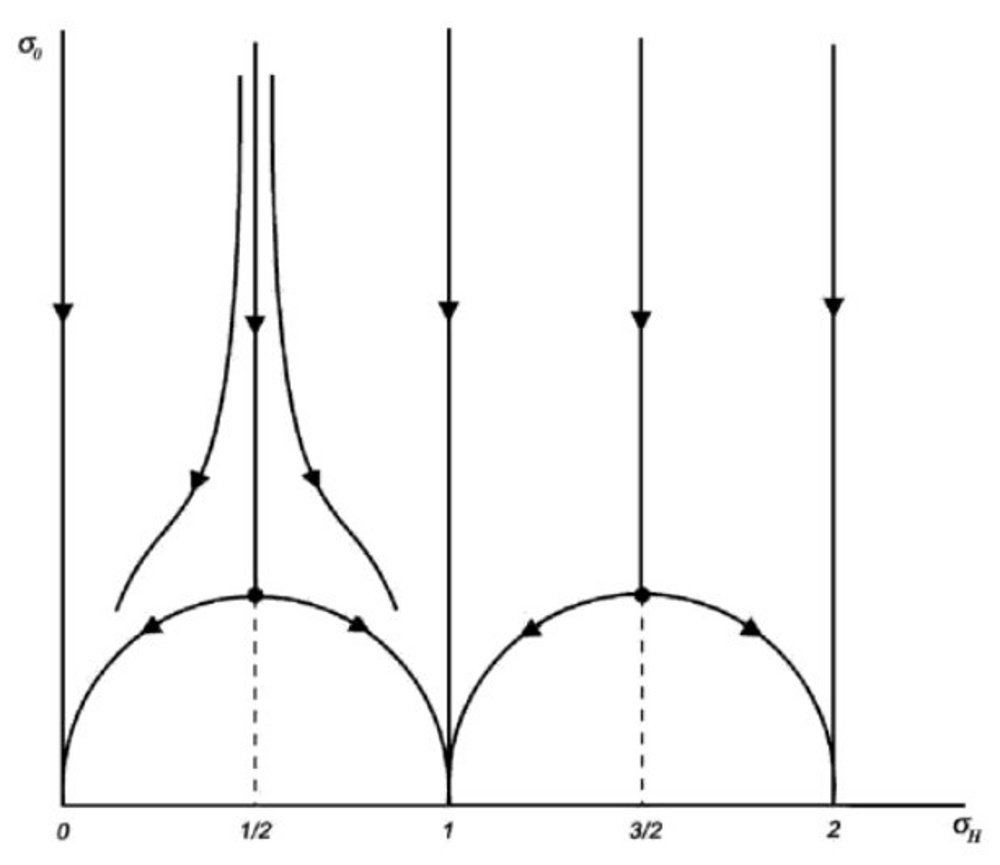
Scaling of the longitudinal and Hall conductivities in a renormalization group flow-diagram of the quantum Hall effect

On the basis of the Renormalization Group Theory of the instanton vacuum one can form a general flow diagram where the topological sectors are represented by attractive fixed points. When scaling the effective system to larger sizes, the system generally flows to a stable phase at one of these points and as we can see in the flow diagram on the right, the longitudinal conductivity will vanish and the Hall conductivity takes on a quantized value. If we started with a Hall conductivity that is halfway between two attractive points, we would end up on the phase transition between topological sectors. As long as the symmetry isn't broken, the longitudinal conductivity doesn't vanish and is even able to increase when scaling to a larger system size. In the flow diagram, we see fixed points that are repulsive in the direction of the Hall current and attractive in the direction of the longitudinal current. It is most interesting to approach these fixed saddle points as close as possible and measure the (universal) behavior of the quantum Hall transitions.

== Super-universality ==
If the system is rescaled, the change in conductivity depends only on the distance between a fixed saddle point and the conductivity. The scaling behavior near the quantum Hall transitions is then universal and different quantum Hall samples will give the same scaling results. But, by studying the quantum Hall transitions theoretically, many different systems that are all in different universality classes have been found to share a super-universal fixed point structure. This means that many different systems that are all in different universality classes still share the same fixed point structure. They all have stable topological sectors and also share other super-universal features. That these features are super-universal is due to the fundamental nature of the vacuum angle that governs the scaling behavior of the systems. The topological vacuum angle can be constructed in any quantum field theory but only under the right circumstances can its features be observed. The vacuum angle also appears in quantum chromodynamics and might have been important in the formation of the early universe.

== See also ==
- Quantum Hall effect
- Anderson localization
- Fermi-liquid theory
- Instantons
- Universality (dynamical systems)
