= Quantum anomalous Hall effect =

Effect in quantum mechanics where conductivity acquires quantized values

Quantum anomalous Hall effect (QAHE) is the "quantum" version of the anomalous Hall effect. While the anomalous Hall effect requires a combination of magnetic polarization and spin-orbit coupling to generate a finite Hall voltage even in the absence of an external magnetic field (hence called "anomalous"), the quantum anomalous Hall effect is its quantized version. The Hall conductivity acquires quantized values proportional to integer multiples of the von Klitzing constant ($e^2/h$) (also called conductance quantum). In this respect the QAHE is similar to the quantum Hall effect. The integer here is equal to the Chern number which arises out of topological properties of the material band structure. These effects are observed in systems called quantum anomalous Hall insulators (also called Chern insulators).

The effect was observed experimentally for the first time in 2013 by a team led by Xue Qikun at Tsinghua University.

== See also ==
- Quantum Hall effect
- Hall effect
