= John Reppy =

American physicist

John David Reppy
- Born: February 16, 1931; Lakehurst, New Jersey
- Education: University of Connecticut, Yale University
- Awards: Oliver E. Buckley Prize (2026)
- Scientific career
- Fields: Quantum properties of superfluids
- Workplaces: Yale University, Cornell University
- Doctoral advisor: C. T. Lane
- Website: physics.cornell.edu/john-reppy

John David Reppy (born February 16, 1931) is a physicist and the John L. Wetherill Professor of Physics Emeritus at Cornell University. He studies the quantum properties of superfluids such as helium. His experiments demonstrated the first evidence of topological phase transitions in superfluids.

Reppy is also a notable rock climber of long standing. He established a number of widely known climbing routes particularly in the northeastern United States.

== Early life and education ==
John David Reppy was born February 16, 1931, in Lakehurst, New Jersey. His father was stationed at the US Naval Air Station, where he worked with helium as a lifting gas for naval lighter-than-air aviation. The family moved almost every year to follow his military placements, including an assignment to Pearl Harbor prior to World War II. In 1943 he was sent to the western Pacific and the rest of the family settled in Haddam Neck, Connecticut.

In Connecticut John Reppy became interested in herpetology, geology and rock climbing, exploring local quarries. He graduated from high school in 1950.

Reppy immediately enrolled at the University of Connecticut, beginning with summer school. He majored in mathematics but also began working for his thermodynamics instructor Charles Reynolds. At this time Reppy became friends with David M. Lee, who was also a student. Reppy received a bachelor's degree in math and physics in 1954 at University of Connecticut and a master's degree from the same school two years later.

In 1956, Reppy joined Cecil T. Lane's Yale Low Temperature group at Yale University. As part of his Ph.D. work, Reppy adapted a design by Jesse Beams and built an apparatus for rotating a container of liquid helium in vacuum and measuring the helium's angular momentum. He completed his dissertation in 1960, and received his PhD from Yale University in 1961. Reppy spent 1961 working with Nicholas Kurti in Oxford on a National Science Foundation (NSF) Fellowship.

== Rock climbing ==
In the 1950s and 60s, Reppy was active on Ragged Mountain in Connecticut where he collaborated on many first ascents and on publishing an area guidebook with Sam Streibert. The well-known Reppy's Crack on Cannon Mountain in New Hampshire bears his name and he has made first ascents as of number of routes in the Shawangunks and elsewhere. He made early attempts on Armadillo, a long alpine rock climb on Mount Katahdin, Maine. In addition, he has climbed extensively in England, the Alps and western America.

Reppy has said his earliest interest in rock climbing as a very young teenager was related to the re-opening of small open-pit mica mines in eastern Connecticut during World War II in response to increased war-time demand for electronics materials.

Reppy was among the first climbers in the United States to practice so-called "clean climbing" techniques, which he learned in England. While most climbers of the day were hammering their way up the cliffs with pitons, Reppy helped introduce the use of nuts, which at the time consisted of hex nuts from truck wheels, strung with nylon webbing. Unlike pitons, nuts are placed and removed without the use of hammers and save the rock from permanent damage. The technique often makes placements easier and faster to achieve, and thus may make difficult climbs easier to complete. Many advances in rock climbing were made possible by this method. Among a substantial number of others deserving credit for this trend in the U.S. are Yvon Chouinard and John Stannard.

== Scientific career ==
Reppy returned to New Haven, Connecticut, in 1962, and spent four years as an assistant professor at Yale University. He joined the Cornell University Physics Department in 1966, becoming the John Wetherill Professor of Physics in 1987. As physics professor at Cornell University, he studies quantum properties of superfluids with an emphasis on boundary conditions and phase transitions in systems of reduced dimensionality.

In 1978, Reppy and David J. Bishop measured the moment of inertia of a helium-coated mylar sheet, studying the phase transitions. They found important differences between laminar superfluidity compared to the bulk behaviour. David Robert Nelson and J. Michael Kosterlitz studied the connection between the Berezinskii–Kosterlitz–Thouless transition and the experiments of Reppy and Bishop, identifying a topological order.

Physicists generally agree that the atoms in superfluid helium-4 is not a Bose–Einstein condensate in the original sense of the term because its atoms interact too strongly. Reppy studied an exception: tiny amounts of helium trapped in nanometer-sized pores of a spongelike glass called Vycor. Even though the pores keep its atoms too far apart to jostle one another much, the helium still behaves like a three-dimensional fluid. In 1983 Reppy and colleagues reported results that suggested the helium was sloshing through the glass as a true Bose–Einstein condensate.

Reppy's research group has close associations with David M. Lee and Robert C. Richardson also of Cornell, who shared the 1996 Nobel Prize in Physics with Douglas D. Osheroff for discoveries related to super fluidity in helium-3 ice. Lee, in his Nobel Prize speech, credited Reppy's "extraordinary technical ingenuity" in experiments leading to the discovery. In the speech, Lee made other references to Reppy, noting that his work helped confirm related insights.

Reppy's work form 1983 also figured at least on the fringes of the 2001 Nobel Prize for Physics which was awarded to Eric Cornell and Carl Wieman of the JILA, in Boulder, Colo., and Wolfgang Ketterle of the Massachusetts Institute of Technology. Bose–Einstein condensation was predicted in 1924, and was seen decades ago in liquid helium, according to Ketterle, who acknowledged a controversial earlier claim by Reppy. Ketterle says that Reppy brought this finding to his attention, and that the priority claim was fair. "I think the results appeared conclusive", Ketterle reportedly said. Co-laureate Wieman reportedly said that Reppy's claim is "really a stretch" and that "Ketterle is being gracious".

Separately, work from Cornell physics laboratories has been used to test a theory of cosmic strings, hypothetical objects, which may have been important in the formation of galaxies, and may have arisen through "phase transitions" in a fraction of a second after the Big Bang.

== Awards ==
Reppy is the recipient of numerous awards and honors, including the Fritz London Memorial Prize in 1981 and the NASA Distinguished Public Service Medal for leadership and support to the NASA microgravity fundamental physics program in 2000. Reppy is also a member of the National Academy of Sciences (1988). In 2025, the 2026 Oliver E. Buckley Prize was awarded to Reppy, David J. Bishop, Gwendal Fève and Michael James Manfra for "groundbreaking experiments that uncovered the role of vortices in the superfluid phase transition in helium films and observed anyonic braiding statistics of quasiparticles in the fractional quantum Hall effect, thus establishing the significance of topological excitations in two-dimensions."
