= Kirtley (surname) =

Kirtley is a surname. Notable people with the surname include:

- Bill Kirtley, English football goalkeeper
- David Barr Kirtley (born 1977), American writer
- James Kirtley (born 1975), English cricketer
- John R. Kirtley (born 1949), American physicist
- Matthew Kirtley (1813–1873), English engineer
- Pat Kirtley, American guitarist and composer
- Pete Kirtley (born 1972), English songwriter, record producer and music entrepreneur
- Thomas Kirtley (1811–1847), English railway engineer
- Virginia Kirtley (1888–1956), American actress and writer
- William Kirtley (railway engineer) (1840–1919), English railway engineer
- William W. Kirtley (1897–1944), known as Bill, American anti-death penalty activist
