= Victor Emery =

British physicist (1934–2002)

- Born: Victor John Emery; May 16, 1934; Boston, Lincolnshire, England
- Died: July 17, 2002 (aged 68); New York City, United States
- Education: University of Manchester
- Scientific career
- Fields: Condensed matter physics
- Doctoral advisor: Richard J. Eden

Victor John Emery (16 May 1934 – 17 July 2002) was a British specialist on superconductors and superfluidity. His model for the electronic structure of the copper-oxide planes is the starting point for many analyses of high-temperature superconductors and is commonly known as the Emery model.

== Early life ==
Emery was born in Boston, Lincolnshire, England. He went to study physics at the University of London (bachelor's degree in science in 1954) and the University of Manchester, where he gained a PhD in theoretical physics under the supervision of Richard J. Eden.

== Career ==
After completing his studies at Manchester he spent two years as a research associate at Cavendish Laboratory in Cambridge. He was a Fellow at the University of California, Berkeley from 1959 to 1960. While at Berkeley in 1960, together with Andrew Sessler, he made the prediction that liquid helium-3 would experience superfluidity by mechanism similar to the one of BCS theory. The theory was later confirmed experimentally in 1972 by David Lee, Douglas Osheroff, and Robert Coleman Richardson, who shared the 1996 Nobel Prize in Physics.

In 1960, Emery returned to the United Kingdom where he spent three years as a lecturer at the University of Birmingham. Afterwards, Emery joined the Brookhaven National Laboratory's Physics Department in 1964. After joining BNL, he worked on fundamental theories for the behaviour of helium-3/helium-4 mixtures.

Emery's work with low-temperature superconductivity laid the foundation for his concentration over the next nine years on the theory of high-temperature superconductivity. Discovered in 1986, high-temperature superconductors have the potential to bring superconducting technology into everyday use.

Emery presented one of the first theories, identifying the nature of the superconducting material's 'holes', which are the carriers of the supercurrent. He correctly stated that the holes tend to sit mainly on oxygen, rather than on copper, contrary to initial popular belief. His model for the electronic structure of the copper-oxide planes is the starting point for many analyses of high-temperature superconductors and is commonly known as the Emery model.

Emery received tenure at Brookhaven National Laboratory in 1967 and was named Senior Physicist in 1972. In the Physics Department he led the Cryogenics Group from 1973 to 1977 and the Solid State Theory Group from 1975 to 1984 and again from 1994.

== Death ==
By 2002, he had been suffering from amyotrophic lateral sclerosis (ALS) for two years. The progressive debility interfered with his work until finally he could no longer go to his office. He died on 17 July of that year.

== Honors and awards ==
In 2001, Emery (with Alan H. Luther) won the Oliver E. Buckley Prize from the American Physical Society for his "fundamental contribution to the theory of interacting electrons in a one-dimension". The theory is believed to be of crucial importance for understanding high temperature superconductors.

On 13 October 2001, Emery became a member of the American Academy of Arts and Sciences.
