= Kathryn Moler =

American physicist

Kathryn A. Moler
- Born: c. 1966 (age 59–60)
- Education: Stanford University
- Scientific career
- Fields: Physics
- Workplaces: Stanford University
- Thesis: Specific Heat of Cuprate Superconductors (1995)
- Doctoral advisor: Aharon Kapitulnik

Kathryn Ann Moler (born c. 1966) is an American physicist, and current dean of research at Stanford University. She received her BSc (1988) and Ph.D. (1995) from Stanford University. After working as a visiting scientist at IBM T.J. Watson Research Center in 1995, she held a postdoctoral position at Princeton University from 1995 to 1998. She joined the faculty of Stanford University in 1998, and became an Associate in CIFAR's Superconductivity Program (now called the Quantum Materials Program) in 2000. She became an associate professor (with tenure) at Stanford in 2002 and is currently a professor of applied physics and of Physics at Stanford. She currently works in the Geballe Laboratory for Advanced Materials (GLAM), and is the director of the Center for Probing the Nanoscale (CPN), a National Science Foundation-funded center where Stanford and IBM scientists continue to improve scanning probe methods for measuring, imaging, and controlling nanoscale phenomena. She lists her scientific interests and main areas of research and experimentation as:

- Single vortex dynamics in classical and high temperature superconductors,
- Spontaneous currents and vortex effects in highly correlated electron systems, and
- Mesoscopic superconductors and currents in normal metal rings, with an increasing interest in the spin properties of such small structures.

== Career ==
Early in her career, with John Kirtley from IBM, their research demonstrated that one of the predictions of a popular theory for high-temperature superconductivity was inaccurate by a factor of 10. In 2011 her research group placed two non-magnetic materials (complex oxides) together and discovered an unexpected result: The layer where the two materials meet has both magnetic and superconducting regions. These are two properties that are normally incompatible, since "superconducting materials, which conduct electricity with no resistance and 100 percent efficiency, normally expel any magnetic field that comes near them." Exploration of this phenomenon will be aimed toward discovery of whether the properties co-exist uneasily, or this marks the discovery of an exotic new form of superconductivity that actively interacts with magnetism.

In May 2018, Moler was named vice provost and dean of research at Stanford University, effective September 1, 2018.

== Awards ==
- Member of the U. S. National Academy of Sciences.
- Carrington Award for Excellence in Research and Teaching
- Stanford Centennial Teaching Assistant
- William L. McMillan Award for outstanding contributions in condensed matter physics
- Packard Fellowship
- Leigh Page Prize Lecturer at Yale University
- R.H. Dicke Postdoctoral Fellowship at Princeton University
- Frederick Terman Fellowship
- Alfred P. Sloan Research Fellowship
- Richtmyer Memorial Award 2011
- NSF CAREER Award

== Publications ==
- "Scanning Probe Manipulation of Magnetism at the LaAlO3/SrTiO3 Heterointerface" — Beena Kalisky: Julie A. Bert, Christopher Bell, Yanwu Xie, Hiroki K. Sato, Masayuki Hosoda, Yasuyuki Hikita, Harold Y. Hwang, and Kathryn A. Moler;
- "Critical thickness for ferromagnetism in LaAlO3/SrTiO3 heterostructures" — Beena Kalisky: Julie A. Bert, Brannon B. Klopfer, Christopher Bell, Hiroki K. Sato, Masayuki Hosoda, Yasuyuki Hikita, Harold Y. Hwang & Kathryn A. Moler;
- "Scanning SQUID susceptometry of a paramagnetic superconductor" — J. R. Kirtley: B. Kalisky, J. A. Bert, C. Bell, M. Kim, Y. Hikita, H. Y. Hwang, J. H. Ngai, Y. Segal, F. J. Walker, C. H. Ahn, and K. A. Moler;
- "Calculation of the effect of random superfluid density on the temperature dependence of the penetration depth" — Thomas M. Lippman: Kathryn A. Moler;
- "Direct imaging of the coexistence of ferromagnetism and superconductivity at the LaAlO3/SrTiO3interface" — Julie A. Bert: Beena Kalisky, Christopher Bell, Minu Kim, Yasuyuki Hikita, Harold Y. Hwang & Kathryn A. Moler;
- "Behavior of vortices near twin boundaries in underdoped Ba(Fe1-xCox)2As2" — B. Kalisky: J. R. Kirtley, J. G. Analytis, J.-H. Chu, I. R. Fisher, and K. A. Moler;
- "Local Measurement of the Superfluid Density in the Pnictide Superconductor Ba(Fe1-xCox)2As2across the Superconducting Dome" — Lan Luan: Thomas M. Lippman, Clifford W. Hicks, Julie A. Bert, Ophir M. Auslaender, Jiun-Haw Chu, James G. Analytis, Ian R. Fisher, and Kathryn A. Moler;

== Papers listed at Stanford ==
- Evidence for a Nodal Energy Gap in the Iron-Pnictide Superconductor LaFePO from Penetration Depth Measurements by Scanning SQUID Susceptometry
- Terraced Scanning SQUID Susceptometer with Sub-Micron Pickup Loops
- Temperature dependence of the half-flux effect
- Fluctuation Superconductivity in Mesoscopic Aluminum Rings
- Mechanics of Individual, Isolated Vortices in a Cuprate Superconductor
- Enhanced superfluid density on twin boundaries in Ba(Fe1-xCox)2As2
- A limit on spin-charge separation in high-Tc superconductors from the absence of a vortex-memory effect
- Persistent Currents in Normal Metal Rings
- Images of interlayer Josephson vortices in Tl2Ba2CuO6+d
- Magnetic field dependence of the density of states of YBa2Cu3O6.95 as determined from the specific heat
