= William Kirtley =

William Kirtley may refer to:

- William Kirtley (railway engineer), English railway engineer
- William W. Kirtley, known as Bill, American anti-death penalty activist
- Bill Kirtley, English football goalkeeper
