= Dale J. van Harlingen =

American solid state physicist

Dale J. Van Harlingen (July 22, 1950 - July 20, 2024) was an American condensed matter physicist.

== Education and career ==
Van Harlingen graduated from Ohio State University with a bachelor's degree in 1972, a master's degree in 1974 and a doctorate in 1977. As a postdoc he spent a year at the Cavendish Laboratory in Cambridge, England and three years with John Clarke at the University of California, Berkeley, where he did research on non-equilibrium superconductors and DC electronics with SQUIDs. Van Harlingen became in 1981 a professor at the University of Illinois at Urbana-Champaign (UIUC) and was then a professor of physics at the UIUC's Laboratory for Materials Research and the NSF Science and Technology Center for Superconductivity.

Van Harlingen did research "on the physics of superconductor materials and devices and on the application of microfabrication, cryogenic, and superconductor electronic techniques to problems of fundamental interest in condensed matter physics." He and his team created innovative scanning probe instruments, especially, the Scanning SQUID Microscope which does imaging of vortex configurations and dynamics in superconductor systems. After high-temperature superconductivity was discovered in 1986, Van Harlingen and his colleagues pioneered the phase-sensitive SQUID interferometry technique which enabled the verification of the exotic d-wave symmetry. In fundamental experiments, with David Wollman, Donald Ginsberg and Anthony Leggett, he determined the symmetry properties of the order parameter in high-temperature superconductors involving some copper oxides. The discovery of such symmetry properties caused a huge research effort to understand the exotic d-wave symmetry and its relation to the mechanisms of unconventional superconductors.

In 1998 he received, jointly with John R. Kirtley, Donald Ginsberg and Chang C. Tsuei, the Oliver E. Buckley Condensed Matter Prize for "using phase-sensitive experiments in the elucidation of the orbital symmetry of the pairing function in high-T_{c} superconductors." He was elected in 1995 a fellow of the American Physical Society, in 1999 a member of the American Academy of Arts and Sciences, and in 2003 a member of the National Academy of Sciences, He was awarded a Guggenheim Fellowship for the academic year 2001–2002.

== Selected publications ==
- Bonalde, I.; Yanoff, Brian D.; Salamon, M. B.; Van Harlingen, D. J.; Chia, E. M. E.; Mao, Z. Q.; Maeno, Y. (2000). "Temperature Dependence of the Penetration Depth in Sr_{2}RuO_{4}: Evidence for Nodes in the Gap Function". Physical Review Letters. 85 (22): 4775–4778. Bibcode:2000PhRvL..85.4775B. doi:10.1103/PhysRevLett.85.4775. PMID 11082649.
- Koch, Roger H.; Van Harlingen, D. J.; Clarke, John (1981). "Observation of Zero-Point Fluctuations in a Resistively Shunted Josephson Tunnel Junction". Physical Review Letters. 47 (17): 1216–1219. Bibcode:1981PhRvL..47.1216K. doi:10.1103/PhysRevLett.47.1216. OSTI 1136482. S2CID 119728862.
- Koch, Roger H.; Van Harlingen, D. J.; Clarke, John (1982). "Measurements of quantum noise in resistively shunted Josephson junctions". Physical Review B. 26: 74–87. Bibcode:1982PhRvB..26...74K. doi:10.1103/PhysRevB.26.74.
- Koch, Roger H.; Clarke, John; Goubau, W. M.; Martinis, J. M.; Pegrum, C. M.; Van Harlingen, D. J. (1983). "Flicker (1/f) noise in tunnel junction dc SQUIDS". Journal of Low Temperature Physics. 51 (1–2): 207–224. Bibcode:1983JLTP...51..207K. doi:10.1007/BF00683423. S2CID 121466063.
- Wollman, D. A.; Van Harlingen, D. J.; Lee, W. C.; Ginsberg, D. M.; Leggett, A. J. (1993). "Experimental determination of the superconducting pairing state in YBCO from the phase coherence of YBCO-Pb dc SQUIDs". Physical Review Letters. 71 (13): 2134–2137. Bibcode:1993PhRvL..71.2134W. doi:10.1103/PhysRevLett.71.2134. PMID 10054591.
- Vu, L. N.; Wistrom, M. S.; Van Harlingen, D. J. (1993). "Imaging of magnetic vortices in superconducting networks and clusters by scanning SQUID microscopy". Applied Physics Letters. 63 (12): 1693–1695. Bibcode:1993ApPhL..63.1693V. doi:10.1063/1.110687.
- Van Harlingen, D. J. (1995). "Phase-sensitive tests of the symmetry of the pairing state in the high-temperature superconductors—Evidence for d_{x^{2}–y^{2}} symmetry". Reviews of Modern Physics. 67 (2): 515–535. Bibcode:1995RvMP...67..515V. doi:10.1103/RevModPhys.67.515.
- Wollman, D. A.; Van Harlingen, D. J.; Giapintzakis, J.; Ginsberg, D. M. (1995). "Evidence for d_{x^{2}–y^{2}} Pairing from the Magnetic Field Modulation of YBa_{2}Cu_{3}O_{7}-Pb Josephson Junctions". Physical Review Letters. 74 (5): 797–800. Bibcode:1995PhRvL..74..797W. doi:10.1103/PhysRevLett.74.797. PMID 10058850.
- Bonalde, I.; Yanoff, Brian D.; Salamon, M. B.; Van Harlingen, D. J.; Chia, E. M. E.; Mao, Z. Q.; Maeno, Y. (2000). "Temperature Dependence of the Penetration Depth in Sr_{2}RuO_{4}: Evidence for Nodes in the Gap Function". Physical Review Letters. 85 (22): 4775–4778. Bibcode:2000PhRvL..85.4775B. doi:10.1103/PhysRevLett.85.4775. PMID 11082649.
- Van Harlingen, D. J.; Robertson, T. L.; Plourde, B. L. T.; Reichardt, P. A.; Crane, T. A.; Clarke, John (2004). "Decoherence in Josephson-junction qubits due to critical-current fluctuations". Physical Review B. 70 (6) 064517. arXiv:cond-mat/0404307. Bibcode:2004PhRvB..70f4517V. doi:10.1103/PhysRevB.70.064517. S2CID 13382789.
- Frolov, S. M.; Van Harlingen, D. J.; Oboznov, V. A.; Bolginov, V. V.; Ryazanov, V. V. (2004). "Measurement of the current-phase relation of superconductor/Ferromagnet/SuperconductorπJosephson junctions". Physical Review B. 70 (14) 144505. arXiv:cond-mat/0402434. Bibcode:2004PhRvB..70n4505F. doi:10.1103/PhysRevB.70.144505.
- Kidwingira, Francoise; Strand, J. D.; Van Harlingen, D. J.; Maeno, Yoshiteru (2006). "Dynamical Superconducting Order Parameter Domains in Sr_{2}RuO_{4}". Science. 314 (5803): 1267–1271. Bibcode:2006Sci...314.1267K. doi:10.1126/science.1133239. PMID 17068225. S2CID 23124624.
- Finck, A. D. K.; Van Harlingen, D. J.; Mohseni, P. K.; Jung, K.; Li, X. (2013). "Anomalous Modulation of a Zero-Bias Peak in a Hybrid Nanowire-Superconductor Device". Physical Review Letters. 110 (12) 126406. arXiv:1212.1101. Bibcode:2013PhRvL.110l6406F. doi:10.1103/PhysRevLett.110.126406. PMID 25166828. S2CID 10114746.
- Kurter, C.; Finck, A.D.K.; Hor, Y. S.; Van Harlingen, D. J. (2015). "Evidence for an anomalous current–phase relation in topological insulator Josephson junctions". Nature Communications. 6: 7130. arXiv:1307.7764. Bibcode:2015NatCo...6.7130K. doi:10.1038/ncomms8130. PMID 26027559. S2CID 29208010.
- Agterberg, Daniel F.; Davis, J.C. Séamus; Edkins, Stephen D.; Fradkin, Eduardo; Van Harlingen, Dale J.; Kivelson, Steven A.; Lee, Patrick A.; Radzihovsky, Leo; Tranquada, John M.; Wang, Yuxuan (2020). "The Physics of Pair-Density Waves: Cuprate Superconductors and Beyond". Annual Review of Condensed Matter Physics. 11: 231–270. arXiv:1904.09687. Bibcode:2020ARCMP..11..231A. doi:10.1146/annurev-conmatphys-031119-050711. S2CID 127956852.
