= Slonczewski =

Slonczewski is a surname. Notable people with the surname include:

- Joan Slonczewski (born 1956), American microbiologist and science fiction writer
- John Slonczewski (1929–2019), American physicist
