= Kirtley =

Kirtley can refer to:

== Surname ==
- Kirtley (surname)

== Given name ==
- Kirtley F. Mather (1888–1978), American geologist

== Places ==
- Kirtley, Texas
- Kirtley, Wyoming
