= Adele Goldberg =

Adele Goldberg may refer to:

- Adele Goldberg (computer scientist) (born 1945), computer scientist who wrote or co-wrote books on the programming language Smalltalk-80
- Adele Goldberg (linguist) (born 1963), researcher in the field of linguistics
