= Meservey =

Meservey may refer to:

- Meservey, Iowa, city
- Robert Meservey (1921–2013), American physicist
- Stillman T. Meservey (1848–1927), American, banker, industrialist, and politician
