= George Pickett (physicist) =

British physicist (1939–2024)

George Richard Pickett
- Born: 10 April 1939
- Died: 21 July 2024 (aged 85); Lancaster, Lancashire, England
- Education: Bedford Modern School
- Alma mater: Magdalen College, Oxford
- Known for: Low Temperature Physics
- Scientific career
- Institutions: Lancaster University

George Richard Pickett FRS (10 April 1939 – 21 July 2024) was a British physicist who was Professor of Low Temperature Physics at Lancaster University.

== Life and career ==
Pickett was born on 10 April 1939. He was educated at Bedford Modern School and Magdalen College, Oxford (BA 1962; DPhil).

Pickett was a Lecturer, Senior Lecturer, Reader and then Head of the Department of Physics at Lancaster University. In the 1996 Nobel Prize citation of physicist David Lee, credit was given to Pickett and his research group for their work on ^{3}He.

In 1988, Pickett was elected a member of the Finnish Academy of Science and Letters. In 1997 he was elected a Fellow of the Royal Society and in 2006 a foreign member of the Russian Academy of Sciences. In 1998 he was awarded the Simon Memorial Prize.

In 2023 he was awarded an honorary degree by the Slovak Academy of Sciences. He died in Lancaster, Lancashire on 21 July 2024, at the age of 85.
