= Save Me Plz =

- Short story by David Barr Kirtley
- Country: United States
- Language: English
- Genre: Fantasy

Publication
- Published in: Realms of Fantasy
- Publication type: magazine
- Publication date: October 2007

Save Me Plz is a fantasy short story by American writer David Barr Kirtley. The story originally appeared in the October 2007 issue of Realms of Fantasy magazine, and was selected for the anthology Fantasy: The Best of the Year, 2008 Edition. It subsequently appeared in the 2015 anthology of gaming-themed fiction PRESS START TO PLAY.

== Plot summary ==
Months after Meg breaks up with Devon due to his video game addiction, she learns that he has vanished without a trace. She sets out to find him, traveling through a world full of fantasy elements such as magic swords and giant spiders, which she seems to regard as normal.

== Reception ==
Locus placed "Save Me Plz" on their recommended reading list for 2007. The New York Journal of Books called it "one of the best tales in PRESS START TO PLAY."
