= Guide to the Galaxy =

Guide to the Galaxy may refer to:

- The Hitchhiker's Guide to the Galaxy, science fiction comedy series
- Geek's Guide to the Galaxy, podcast focusing on fantasy & science fiction
