= Aharon Kapitulnik =

Israeli-American physicist

- אהרון קפיטולניק
- Born: 1953 (age 72–73); Israel
- Education: Tel Aviv University
- Known for: High Temperature Superconductivity; Quantum Phase Transitions
- Awards: Heike Kamerlingh-Onnes Prize (2009); Oliver E. Buckley Condensed Matter Prize (2015)
- Scientific career
- Fields: Experimental physics
- Workplaces: Stanford University
- Doctoral advisor: Guy Deutscher
- Doctoral students: Julia Hsu; Nadya Mason; Kathryn Moler; Ali Yazdani; David Mitzi

Aharon Kapitulnik (Hebrew: אהרון קפיטולניק; born 1953) is an Israeli-American experimental condensed matter physicist working at Stanford University. He is known primarily for his work on strongly correlated electron systems, low dimensional electronic systems, unconventional superconductors, topological superconductors, superconductivity and magnetism, transport in bad metals and precision measurements.

== Education and career ==
Kapitulnik studied physics at Tel Aviv University in Israel (BA 1978, PhD 1983). After completing his doctoral studies under supervision of Guy Deutscher on the physics of disorder he moved to United States to work on polymers as a postdoc scholar in the group of Alan Heeger at UC Santa Barbara. In 1985 he joined the faculty of the Department of Applied Physics of Stanford University where he became a Professor Applied Physics and Physics in 1994.

At Stanford, Kapitulnik formed a close collaboration with Theodore Geballe and Malcolm Beasley known collectively as the "KGB group". Many of its graduates went on to establish successful academic careers in US and around the world.

== Awards ==
Kapitulnik is the Theodore and Sydney Rosenberg Professor in Applied Physics at Stanford University and the Sackler Professor by Special Appointment at Tel Aviv University. He is a Member of the National Academy of Sciences, a Fellow of American Academy of Arts and Sciences and a Fellow of the American Physical Society. He was awarded the 2015 Oliver E. Buckley Condensed Matter Prize of the American Physical Society for the "discovery and pioneering investigations of the superconductor-insulator transition, a paradigm for quantum phase transitions" and 2009 Heike Kamerlingh-Onnes Prize for "seminal studies of time-reversal-symmetry breaking effects in unconventional superconductors using magneto optics".
