= Guy Deutscher =

Guy Deutscher may refer to:

- Guy Deutscher (linguist) (born 1969), Israeli linguist
- Guy Deutscher (physicist), Israeli physicist
