= George Watkins =

George Watkins may refer to:

- George Watkins (baseball) (1900–1970), Major League Baseball player
- George Watkins (politician) (1902–1970), U.S. Representative from Pennsylvania
- George L. Watkins (1886–1962), college football player, coach and mayor of Tulsa, Oklahoma
- George C. Watkins (1815–1872), Arkansas attorney
- George D. Watkins (1924–2026), American solid-state physicist
