= Ady Stern =

Israeli physicist (born 1960)

Adiel (Ady) Stern (Hebrew: עדי שטרן; born 1960) is an Israeli physicist.

Ady Stern is a professor at the Condensed Matter Physics Department at the Weizmann Institute of Science and a theoretical physicist focused on the ways quantum theory manifests in electronic systems. He is best known for his research on the theoretical aspects of the fractional quantum Hall effect and the existence of quasiparticles with one-quarter the charge of an electron. In his scientific work, Stern emphasizes finding clear physical interpretations for complex phenomena, while his passion for popularizing science is reflected in his hobby of science communication.

In 2025 he won the IOP's Simon Memorial Prize: Low Temperature Group for his original and influential theoretical work on the quantum Hall effect, quantum statistics of emerging quasi-particles, topological order and decoherence in condensed matter systems at low temperatures.

== Biography ==
Ady was born and raised in Beersheba, and presently lives in Tel-Aviv. he studied in Tel-Aviv University for a B.Sc. in Mathematics, Computer Science and Physics, and for a Ph.D. in Physics. Following his Ph.D. he spent three years as a Junior Fellow at the Harvard Society of Fellows, and at the end of these three years he joined the Weizmann Institute as a faculty member.

== Published works ==
- Topological Quantum Computation—From Basic Concepts to First Experiments

== See also ==
- Science and technology in Israel
