= Richard A. Webb =

American physicist

- Born: 10 September 1946
- Died: 23 January 2016 (aged 69)

Academic background
- Education: University of California San Diego

Richard A. Webb (10 September 1946 – 23 January 2016) was an experimental solid-state physicist who is particularly noted for his work on the electronic properties of mesoscopic systems.

== Life ==
Richard Webb received his BSc degree from UC Berkeley (1968) and his M.S. and Ph.D. degrees from UC San Diego (1970 and 1973). Between 1978 and 1993 he was researcher at the IBM Thomas J. Watson Research Center. From 1993 to 2004 he was a professor at the University of Maryland, College Park, where he worked at the Center for Superconductivity Research. Starting 2004, he was a professor at the University of South Carolina.

== Research ==
Main research activity of Richard Webb was the experimental study of the electronic properties of mesoscopic systems, i.e. structures with spatial dimensions that are similar to fundamental physical length scales for the electrons in the materials, such as the coherence length or the Fermi wavelength. One particularly important result was the observation of Aharonov–Bohm oscillations in metallic rings.

== Awards and Distinctions ==
- 1985 APS Fellow
- 1989 Simon Memorial Prize
- 1992 Oliver E. Buckley Condensed Matter Prize of the American Physical Society
- 1996 Member of the National Academy of Sciences
