= Adele Goldberg (linguist) =

American linguist (born 1963)

Adele Eva Goldberg
- Born: November 9, 1963 (age 62); Columbus, Ohio, U.S.
- Known for: Construction grammar
- Spouse: Ali Yazdani
- Children: 2
- Relatives: Ken Y. Goldberg (brother)

Academic background
- Education: University of California, Berkeley (Ph.D.); University of Pennsylvania (B.A.)
- Thesis: Argument structure constructions
- Doctoral advisor: George Lakoff

Academic work
- Discipline: Linguistics, Psychology, Cognitive science
- Institutions: Princeton University; Beckman Institute, University of Illinois at Urbana–Champaign; University of California, San Diego
- Website: adele.princeton.edu

Adele Eva Goldberg (born 1963) is an American linguist known for her development of construction grammar and the constructionist approach in the tradition of cognitive linguistics. She is M. Taylor Pyne Professor of Psychology at Princeton University.

== Early life ==
Goldberg grew up in Bethlehem, Pennsylvania, where her mother (1938- ) was a reading teacher and her father(1937-1992) was an engineer. Her brother, Ken Y. Goldberg is a professor in the industrial engineering and operations research department at the University of California, Berkeley, and her sister, Elena is a pediatrician and child psychologist in Brooklyn.

== Academic career ==
Goldberg received a B.A. in Mathematics and Philosophy from University of Pennsylvania in 1985 before spending two years in the Logic and Methodology of Science program at University of California at Berkeley. She then transferred to linguistics to work with George Lakoff and earned her PhD in linguistics in 1992, studying with Lakoff, Eve Sweetser, Charles Fillmore, and Dan Slobin. Her thesis argues that basic grammatical patterns in English are directly associated with meaning, offering one of the earliest arguments that constructions as well as words contribute to propositional content.

After receiving her PhD, Goldberg joined the University of California, San Diego as an assistant professor of linguistics (1992-1997), and Associate Professor (1997-1998). From 1997 to 2004, she was associate professor of linguistics at the Beckman Institute, University of Illinois at Urbana–Champaign before moving to Princeton University in 2004 as Professor of Psychology and Linguistics.

She has continued to work on the relationship between form and function in language in language processing, and language learning by children and adults.

== Awards and honors ==
- Member, American Academy of Arts and Sciences (2026-)
- President of the Cognitive Science Society (2023)
- Appointed M. Taylor Pyne Professor of Psychology (2024)
- Fellow, Cognitive Science Society (2025-)
- Fellow, Association for Psychological Science (2020-)
- Fillmore Professorship, Linguistic Society of America Institute (2019)
- Labex International Chair, Paris, France. (2016)
- Humboldt Research Award (2016)
- Fellow, Linguistic Society of America (2014-)
- Visiting Fellow, Einstein Foundation. Freie Universitat, Berlin. (2010–2014)
- Fellow at Center for Advanced Study in the Behavioral Sciences. Stanford, California. (2003–2004)
- Fellow of the Center for Advanced Study, UIUC. (2000)
- Gustave O. Arlt Book Award. North American Graduate Council for Constructions (1995).

== Personal life ==
Goldberg married Ali Yazdani, currently a professor of physics at Princeton, in 1994 and they have two children.

== Selected publications ==
- Goldberg, Adele E. (2019). Explain me this : creativity, competition, and the partial productivity of constructions. Princeton, New Jersey. ISBN 978-0-691-18395-4. OCLC 1066741220.
- Goldberg, Adele E. (2013-12-16). "Constructionist Approaches". In Hoffmann, Thomas; Trousdale, Graeme (eds.). The Oxford handbook of construction grammar. Oxford, UK: Oxford University Press. pp. 14–31. doi:10.1093/oxfordhb/9780195396683.013.0002. ISBN 978-0-19-539668-3. OCLC 793099515.
- Goldberg, Adele E. (January 2009). "Constructions work". Cognitive Linguistics. 20 (1): 201–224. doi:10.1515/COGL.2009.013. ISSN 0936-5907. S2CID 201099888.
- Goldberg, Adele E.; Jackendoff, Ray (2004). "The English Resultative as a Family of Constructions". Language. 80 (3): 532–568. doi:10.1353/lan.2004.0129. ISSN 0097-8507. JSTOR 4489722. S2CID 16793207.
- Goldberg, Adele E.; Casenhiser, Devin M.; Sethuraman, Nitya (2004-01-22). "Learning argument structure generalizations". Cognitive Linguistics. 15 (3): 289–316. doi:10.1515/cogl.2004.011. ISSN 0936-5907.
- Goldberg, Adele E (May 2003). "Constructions: a new theoretical approach to language". Trends in Cognitive Sciences. 7 (5): 219–224. doi:10.1016/S1364-6613(03)00080-9. PMID 12757824. S2CID 12393863.
- Goldberg, Adele E. (1995). Constructions : a construction grammar approach to argument structure. Chicago: University of Chicago Press. ISBN 0-226-30085-4. OCLC 30594418.
