= Gerald J. Dolan =

American physicist

Gerald J. Dolan (27 March 1945 in Philadelphia – 17 June 2008 in Huntingdon Valley, Pennsylvania) was an American solid state physicist.

== Education and career ==
Dolan received his bachelor's degree in physics in 1967 from the University of Pennsylvania and his Ph.D. in 1973 from Cornell University under John Silcox. As a post-doctoral researcher, he was at the State University of New York at Stony Brook (SUNY) under J. E. Lukens, doing research on thin-film superconductors from 1973 to 1976. From 1976 to 1987, he was at Bell Labs where he worked under the supervision of Theodore A. Fulton and then, from 1987 to 1989, at IBM's Thomas J. Watson Research Center. From 1989 to 1996, he was a professor at the University of Pennsylvania. In 1996, he became a consultant in medical physics for Immunicon Corporation. He was briefly a guest researcher at the University of Twente.

Dolan was a pioneer in the development of small tunnel junction circuits for the study of solid-state quantum phenomena and for the observation of individual electrons. In 1987, he developed with Theodore A. Fulton at Bell Laboratories the first single-electron transistor. In the last part of his career, he worked on medical applications.

In 1987, he was elected a Fellow of the American Physical Society "for development of new techniques for fabricating microstructures and for contributions to our understanding of the physics of these microstructures".

In 2000, he received, with Theodore A. Fulton and Marc A. Kastner, the Oliver E. Buckley Condensed Matter Prize for "pioneering contributions to single electron effects in mesoscopic systems".
