= Nikolai Kopnin =

Russian physicist

Nikolai Borisovich Kopnin (May 17, 1946 – October 20, 2013) was a Russian physicist specializing in superconductivity.

== Education and career ==
Born in Moscow, Kopnin earned a master's degree in physics in 1970 from Moscow Institute of Physics and Technology and a PhD in physics and mathematics in 1973 from the Landau Institute for Theoretical Physics, where his supervisor was Lev P. Gor’kov; his dissertation was on vortices in Type II superconductors. He remained at the Landau Institute as a researcher and in 1984 was awarded a higher doctorate and became a Leading Research Fellow. From 1988 to 1994 he was a professor of physics at Moscow State Institute of Radio Engineering, Electronics and Automation. In 2000 he joined the faculty of the Low Temperature Laboratory at the Helsinki University of Technology in Finland, now Aalto University. He was also a visiting professor at, among others, CNRS in Grenoble and the University of Paris-Sud in France, the Hebrew University of Jerusalem in Israel, and the University of Chicago and the Argonne National Laboratory in the USA.

== Research ==
Kopnin's primary research area was superconductivity, in particular non-equilibrium and non-stationary phenomena. One of the forces acting on quantum vortices in superfluids and superconductors is known as the "Kopnin force" after him. In 1991, by extending his theory concerning this force to chiral superfluids, he predicted the existence of fermionic bound states, quasiparticles now known as Majorana fermions and that it may be possible to observe in topological superfluids and superconductors. He contributed to the studies of anisotropic and layered superconductors and developed the microscopic theories for dissipative and non-stationary flow in Fermi superfluids. His 2001 monograph Theory of Nonequilibrium Superconductivity has been widely cited. He published more than 150 articles in international journals.

== Honors ==
In 2011, with his Landau colleague S.V. Iordanskii, Kopnin was awarded the Simon Memorial Prize of the Institute of Physics for his work on the forces acting on quantum vortices in superfluids and superconductors.

== Family ==
Nikolai Kopnin is survived by his widow Sidelnikova Anna and four children: Helen Kopnina, Anna Grifa, Petr Kopnin, Olga Kopnina.
