= Simon Memorial Prize =

Award in low temperature physics

The Simon Memorial Prize is an award that honors 'distinguished work in experimental or theoretical low temperature physics'. The prize is awarded by the Institute of Physics and is presented at the International Conference on Low Temperature Physics, which takes place every three years. The prize is named after Francis Simon, who contributed eminently to the field of low-temperature physics. The first prize was awarded in 1959 to Heinz London.

Not to be confused with the Robert Simon Memorial Prize awarded for dissertations from the Department of Applied Physics and Applied Mathematics of Columbia University.

== Winners ==
The following have won this prize:

Recipients of the Simon Memorial Prize
Year	Recipient	Citation
2025	Ady Stern	For original and influential theoretical work on the quantum Hall effect, quantum statistics of emerging quasi-particles, topological order and decoherence in condensed matter systems at low temperatures.
2020	Jukka Pekola	For fundamental achievements in quantum thermodynamics, metrology and cryogenics based on nanoscale electronic devices.
2017	Louis Taillefer	For pioneering transport measurements at high magnetic fields and low temperature in heavy-fermion and cuprate superconductors.
2014	Peter Wölfle	For fundamental contributions to the theory of quantum transport processes in superfluid 3He, heavy fermion superconductors and disordered metals.
2011	Sergey V. Iordanski	"For their calculations and predictions of the fundamental forces acting on quantised vortices in superfluids, superconductors and other ordered systems: The Iordanskii force and the Kopnin force"
2011	Nikolai B. Kopnin	"For their calculations and predictions of the fundamental forces acting on quantised vortices in superfluids, superconductors and other ordered systems: The Iordanskii force and the Kopnin force"
2008	Yasunobu Nakamura	"For their pioneering demonstration of quantum coherent behaviour in a macroscopic object and for their subsequent explorations of quantum coherent physics in a series of novel superconducting devices."
2008	Jaw-Shen Tsai	"For their pioneering demonstration of quantum coherent behaviour in a macroscopic object and for their subsequent explorations of quantum coherent physics in a series of novel superconducting devices."
2004	Grigory Volovik	"for his pioneering research on the effects of symmetry in superfluids and superconductors and the extension of these ideas to quantum field theory, cosmology, quantum gravity and particle physics."
2001	Giorgio Frossati	
1998	George R. Pickett	In recognition of their outstanding contributions to the field of low temperature physics.
1998	Anthony M. Guénault	In recognition of their outstanding contributions to the field of low temperature physics.
1995	Alexander F. Andreev	
1992	Olivier Avenel	
1992	Eric Varoquaux	
1989	Richard A. Webb	
1986	Yuri V. Sharvin	in recognition of his outstanding experimental contributions to our understanding of the low temperature properties of metals.
1983	David Olaf Edwards	for his outstanding research on liquid and solid helium and their surfaces.
1981	Anthony James Leggett	for his outstanding contribution to the theory of superfluid He^{3}.
1976	David M. Lee	for their discovery in 1972 of the new low temperature phases of liquid helium-3.
1976	Douglas D. Osheroff	for their discovery in 1972 of the new low temperature phases of liquid helium-3.
1976	Robert C. Richardson	for their discovery in 1972 of the new low temperature phases of liquid helium-3.
1973	Peter Kapitza	for distinguished work in the field of low-temperature physics.
1970	Walther Meissner	for his work in many areas of low temperature physics and technology and, in particular, in the field of superconductivity.
1968	Kurt Alfred Georg Mendelssohn	in recognition of distinguished work in superconductivity and the properties of liquid helium.
1965	John Charles Wheatley	in recognition of his outstanding work on the properties of liquid helium-3 at very low temperatures.
1963	Henry Edgar Hall	for their work on liquid helium II
1963	William Frank Vinen	for their work on liquid helium II
1961	Ilya Lifshitz	for his many contributions to the understanding of the structure of the Fermi surface in metals and for his work on liquid helium.
1959	Heinz London	

== See also ==
- Institute of Physics Awards
- List of physics awards
- List of awards named after people
