= Robert B. Meyer =

American physicist and professor

- Born: Robert Bruce Meyer; October 13, 1943; St. Louis, Missouri U.S.
- Died: November 17, 2023 (aged 80)
- Education: Harvard University
- Scientific career
- Fields: Liquid crystal
- Workplaces: Harvard University; Brandeis University
- Thesis: (1970)
- Doctoral advisor: David Turnbull

Robert Bruce Meyer (October 13, 1943 St. Louis- November 17, 2023) was an American physicist and professor at Brandeis University.

Meyer graduated from Harvard University in 1965 with a bachelor's degree and in 1970 with a doctoral degree with advisor David Turnbull and dissertation on effects of electromagnetic fields on the structure of liquid crystals. At Harvard, Meyer was a postdoctoral student and became in 1971 an assistant professor and in 1974 an associate professor. At Brandeis University he was appointed an associate professor in 1978 and a full professor in 1985.

He was a visiting professor in 1977 of Nordita at Chalmers University in Gothenburg and in 1978 Joliot Curie Professor at the École Supérieure de Physique et de Chimie Industrielle in Paris.

His research has concerned various aspects of the physics and chemistry of liquid crystals, including fundamental studies of liquid crystal ordering in a variety of systems, electric and magnetic field effects, defect structures, phase changes, and the relationship between molecular structure and novel macroscopic properties such as flexoelectricity and ferroelectricity. Recently, his research has concentrated on liquid crystalline gels and elastomers, and textures and modulated phases in ferroelectric liquid crystals.

In 2006 Meyer received, jointly with Noel A. Clark, the Oliver E. Buckley Condensed Matter Prize for basic theoretical and experimental studies of liquid crystals, in particular their ferroelectric and chiral properties (laudation). He was elected in 1985 a Fellow of the American Physical Society and received the 2004 Benjamin Franklin Medal of the Franklin Institute.
