= Jagadeesh Moodera =

American physicist

Jagadeesh Subbaiah Moodera is an American physicist of Indian origin and is senior research scientist at MIT's Francis Bitter Magnet Laboratory. In 1995 together with the MIT research team led by P.M. Tedrow and R. Meservey, they showed a practical way to implement room temperature magnetic tunnel junction (MTJ) using a magnetic stack based on CoFe–Al_{2}O_{3}–Co, demonstrating a tunnel magnetoresistance ratio (TMR) of 11.8%.

Low temperature magnetoresistive tunneling had been discovered by Michel Julliere in 1975 but it would be more than a decade before a room temperature system was found. In 1991, Terunobu Miyazaki and others at Tohoku University had demonstrated a MTJ with room temperature TMR of 2.7%. Also in 1995, Miyazaki's team developed a room temperature MTJ with high TMR (18.0%) based on an Fe–Al_{2}O_{3}–Fe stack. Thus, both Moodera and Miyazaki are recognized as the developer of room temperature MTJ. Besides its great fundamental interest, room temperature magnetoresistive tunnelling is the basis for practical devices including MRAM and read heads used in hard disks.

Moodera was named a Fellow of the American Physical Society in 2000 "for pioneering and sustained contributions to the understanding of spin-polarized transport in solids". Before investigating ferromagnetic tunneling, Moodera worked on spin-polarized tunneling in superconductor junctions along with Bob Meservey and Paul Tedrow. Moodera, Meservey, Tedrow and Miyazaki shared the 2009 Oliver E. Buckley Condensed Matter Prize "for pioneering work in the field of spin-dependent tunneling and for the application of these phenomena to the field of magnetoelectronics".

Born in Bangalore, India, Moodera attended Mysore University (B.S. and M.S.) and the Indian Institute of Technology (Ph.D.). He was briefly at West Virginia University before joining the Francis Bitter Magnet Laboratory staff at MIT in 1981.
