= Paul Chaikin =

American physicist (born 1945)

Paul Michael Chaikin (born November 14, 1945, in Brooklyn, New York) is an American physicist known particularly for many significant contributions to the field of soft condensed matter physics.

== Education and research career ==
After graduating from Stuyvesant High School in New York City, Paul Chaikin earned his B.S. in physics from California Institute of Technology in 1966, and his Ph.D. in physics from the University of Pennsylvania in 1971 working with Kondo superconductors. He joined the physics faculty at the University of California, Los Angeles in 1972 and studied thermopower, density waves, and high field phenomena mostly in organic superconductors. The lure of actually seeing the microscopics of a system led him to soft matter. He helped develop techniques to measure elasticity and motion and understand colloidal interactions. Hard and soft matter interests continued after joining the faculty at UPenn (1983), the staff at Exxon Research (1983) and the faculty at Princeton University (1988).

His interests in geometry/topology led to his founding contributions to diblock copolymer nanolithography, and studies of defects, annealing, and pattern formation. He helped demonstrate and explain why ellipsoids pack more densely than spheres. In 2005 he helped found the Center for Soft Matter Research at New York University. His more recent research centers on artificial self-replication, self-assembly, active matter, DNA nanotechnology, topological defects on curved surfaces, and quantifying order far from equilibrium.

He is currently a Silver professor of physics at New York University.

== Books ==
"Principles of Condensed Matter Physics" ISBN 0-521-43224-3 with Tom Lubensky (published by Cambridge University Press)

"The Adult Coloring Book: Phases of Matter" ISBN 978-0998281759 with Colm P. Kelleher, Rodrigo E. Guerra, and Andrew D. Hollingsworth (published by Green Frog Publishing)

== Awards ==
Awards include a Sloan Fellowship (1979–81), a Guggenheim Fellowship (1997), and election to both the American Academy of Arts and Sciences (2003) and the National Academy of Sciences (2004). In 2009 he won a World Technology Award for individual contribution in materials research. He has been awarded the 2018 Oliver Buckley Prize with the citation "for pioneering contributions that opened new directions in the field of soft condensed matter physics through innovative studies of colloids, polymers, and packing."
