= Noel A. Clark =

American physicist and professor

Noel Anthony Clark (born 17 December 1940 in Cleveland, Ohio) is an American physicist, university professor at the University of Colorado Boulder, and pioneer in the development of electro-optical applications of liquid crystals.

Clark graduated from John Carroll University with a bachelor's degree in 1963 and a master's degree in 1965. He received his doctorate from Massachusetts Institute of Technology in 1970 under George Benedek. At Harvard University, Clark was a postdoc from 1970 to 1973 and an assistant professor from 1973 to 1977. At the University of Colorado he became an associate professor in 1977 and a full professor in 1981. There he heads the Liquid Crystal Materials Research Center (later Soft Materials Research Center). In 1984, he was one of the founders of Displaytech, Inc., manufacturing color TFN modules, monochrome graphic displays, and segmented TN LCDs.

Clark has worked in many areas in soft condensed matter and complex fluid physics, including liquid crystals, colloidal liquids and crystals, liquid structure and melting, and biophysics. His liquid crystal research has focused on the use of ultrathin freely-suspended films to study the effects of interfacial confinement and low dimensionality on phase behavior, and on liquid crystal electro-optics, in particular the physics and applications of ferroelectric liquid crystals. His current interests are in liquid crystals of nucleic acids and in the exotic soft phases formed by banana-shaped molecules, especially their interplay of polarity and chirality, and the appearance of macroscopic chiral phases in fluids of achiral molecules.

Professor Clark's group has pioneered a major new liquid crystal electro-optic technology, employing ferroelectric liquid crystals to make high-speed bistable light valves. These devices, which can be configured into linear and matrix arrays, are of particular use in optical computing and are one of the principal technologies to be developed in the Center for Optoelectronic Computing Systems at the University of Colorado. Recently the group has begun a new project on fabrication of structures on a nanometer length scale. This work, which grew out of their research on biomembrane liquid crystals, is directed toward using two-dimensional protein crystals as fabrication masks and templates.

In 2006 he received, jointly with Robert B. Meyer, the Oliver E. Buckley Condensed Matter Prize for basic theoretical and experimental studies on liquid crystals, in particular their ferroelectric and chiral properties (laudatio). He was elected a Fellow of the American Physical Society in 1984 and the American Association for the Advancement of Science in 2000. Since 2007 he is a member of the National Academy of Sciences. He was a Guggenheim Fellow in 1985/86 and received a Humboldt Research Award.

== Selected publications ==
- Chen, Dong; Porada, Jan H.; Hooper, Justin B.; Klittnick, Arthur; Shen, Yongqiang; Tuchband, Michael R.; Korblova, Eva; Bedrov, Dmitry; Walba, David M.; Glaser, Matthew A.; Maclennan, Joseph E.; Clark, Noel A. (4 September 2013). "Chiral heliconical ground state of nanoscale pitch in a nematic liquid crystal of achiral molecular dimers". Proceedings of the National Academy of Sciences. 110 (40): 15931–15936. Bibcode:2013PNAS..11015931C. doi:10.1073/pnas.1314654110. ISSN 0027-8424. PMC 3791744. PMID 24006362.
- Hough, L. E.; Jung, H. T.; Krüerke, D.; Heberling, M. S.; Nakata, M.; Jones, C. D.; Chen, D.; Link, D. R.; Zasadzinski, J.; Heppke, G.; Rabe, J. P.; Stocker, W.; Körblova, E.; Walba, D. M.; Glaser, M. A.; Clark, N. A. (23 July 2009). "Helical Nanofilament Phases". Science. 325 (5939). American Association for the Advancement of Science (AAAS): 456–460. Bibcode:2009Sci...325..456H. doi:10.1126/science.1170027. ISSN 0036-8075. PMID 19628864. S2CID 26379217.
- Hough, L. E.; Spannuth, M.; Nakata, M.; Coleman, D. A.; Jones, C. D.; Dantlgraber, G.; Tschierske, C.; Watanabe, J.; Körblova, E.; Walba, D. M.; Maclennan, J. E.; Glaser, M. A.; Clark, N. A. (23 July 2009). "Chiral Isotropic Liquids from Achiral Molecules". Science. 325 (5939). American Association for the Advancement of Science (AAAS): 452–456. Bibcode:2009Sci...325..452H. doi:10.1126/science.1170028. ISSN 0036-8075. PMID 19628863. S2CID 29480672.
- Fang, G.J.; Maclennan, J.E.; Yi, Y.; Glaser, M.A.; Farrow, M.; Korblova, E.; Walba, D.M.; Furtak, T.E.; Clark, N.A. (26 February 2013). "Athermal photofluidization of glasses". Nature Communications. 4 (1). Springer Science and Business Media LLC: 1521. Bibcode:2013NatCo...4.1521F. doi:10.1038/ncomms2483. ISSN 2041-1723. PMID 23443549.
- Chen, Dong; Maclennan, Joseph E.; Shao, Renfan; Yoon, Dong Ki; Wang, Haitao; Korblova, Eva; Walba, David M.; Glaser, Matthew A.; Clark, Noel A. (27 July 2011). "Chirality-Preserving Growth of Helical Filaments in the B4 Phase of Bent-Core Liquid Crystals". Journal of the American Chemical Society. 133 (32). American Chemical Society (ACS): 12656–12663. Bibcode:2011JAChS.13312656C. doi:10.1021/ja203522x. ISSN 0002-7863. PMID 21692442.
