= Tom Lubensky =

American physicist (born 1943)

Tom C. Lubensky (born Kansas City, Missouri 7 May 1943) is an American physicist. He is currently the Christopher H. Browne Distinguished Professor Emeritus at the University of Pennsylvania, where he was Mary Amanda Wood professor of physics (1998–2009) and chair of the Department of Physics and Astronomy.

== Biography ==
Dr. Lubensky received his B.S. in physics from the California Institute of Technology in 1964 and both his M.A. (1965) and Ph.D. (1969) in physics from Harvard University. He was an NSF Postdoctoral Fellow at the University of Paris in Orsay (1969–70) and a postdoctoral research associate at Brown University (1970–71). He joined the University of Pennsylvania in 1971, promoted to associate professor in 1975 and to full professor in 1980.

== Memberships ==
He is a fellow of the American Physical Society (1985), American Association for the Advancement of Science (2000), elected member of the National Academy of Sciences (2002) and the American Academy of Arts and Sciences (2007), Alfred P. Sloan Fellow (1975–77), Guggenheim Fellow (1981), and honored member of the International Liquid Crystal Society.

== Awards ==
In 2004 Dr. Lubensky received Oliver E. Buckley Condensed Matter Prize for seminal contributions to the theory of condensed matter systems including the prediction and elucidation of the properties of new, partially ordered phases of complex materials. in 2024 he was awarded the de Gennes medal by the International Liquid Crystal Liquid Crystal Society for pioneering high-level scientific achievement in liquid crystals.

== Books ==
Lubensky is the coauthor of the textbook Principles of Condensed Matter Physics (ISBN 0-521-43224-3) with Paul Chaikin.
