= Rash Bihari Ghosh =

American environmental scientist (born 1940s)

Rash B. Ghosh
- রাসবিহারী ঘোষ
- Born: Rash Bihari Ghosh; 1944 (age 81–82); Osmanpur, Bajitpur, Bengal, British India (now Kishoreganj District, Bangladesh)
- Other names: Rashbihari Ghosh; R. B. Ghose
- Education: University of Salford (PhD)
- Occupations: Environmental scientist, nonprofit executive, activist
- Organization(s): International Institute of Bengal and Himalayan Basins
- Known for: Survey of the invertebrates of the Mersey Estuary; Hydrogrameen proposal
- Website: iibhb.org

Rash Bihari Ghosh (Bengali: রাসবিহারী ঘোষ; born 1944), also known as Rash B. Ghosh, is a Bangladeshi-American environmental scientist and activist and founder of the International Institute of Bengal and Himalayan Basins (IIBHB), a nonprofit concerned with arsenic contamination of groundwater and water management in the Bengal Basin, co-founded by Nobel Laureate physicist Charles H. Townes. Ghosh was member of the Bangladesh Teachers' Association and an aide to Sheikh Mujibur Rahman during the Bangladesh Liberation War of 1971, and has since campaigned in Bangladesh against the pollution of the Buriganga River.

== Early life and education ==
Ghosh was born in 1944 or 1945 in the village of Osmanpur in Bajitpur, Kishoreganj, to Rajani Kanta Ghosh and Sushila Ghosh. He went to school in Bajitpur, completed his higher-secondary studies at Jagannath College in Dhaka, and took undergraduate and graduate degrees at the University of Dhaka. He taught chemistry and, at the age of 24, wrote a chemistry textbook in Bengali. He was an assistant professor at Jagannath College, before traveling abroad to study; when he left Bangladesh, he donated his family's land to the people who lived on it.

During the Bangladesh Liberation War of 1971, Ghosh was active in the Bangladesh Teachers' Association, which had its wartime office in Calcutta. Ghosh was elected joint secretary of the association and served as its acting secretary in 1971. Ghosh met U.S. senator Edward Kennedy during the senator's 1971 visit to India, and he was a signatory of an open letter from Bangladeshi intellectuals, teachers, film artists and sportspeople, calling for the United States to recognize Bangladesh, and for the protection and release of Sheikh Mujibur Rahman.

== Research on water chemistry ==
Ghosh did his doctoral research at the University of Salford in England, completing a 1979 PhD thesis in biology, title An ecological investigation of the invertebrates of the Mersey estuary. His research examined 10 sites in the outer and inner estuary and recorded 135 invertebrate species, finding that invertebrates live only where the intertidal flats have a suitable substrate, and that the meandering low-water channel continually erodes and re-forms these habitats. Ghosh also wrote the chapter "The littoral macro-invertebrates" in The Ecology of the Mersey Estuary (1980), a University of Salford report for the North West Water Authority.

Ghosh lectured in water science and technology at Salford and was later a scientist at Stanford University, where he did research for NASA on canopy chemistry, climate and nutrient cycling, and authored proposals for the monitoring of aquatic habitat and water quality in South San Francisco Bay. In 1986, Ghosh was appointed a hazardous waste specialist in the California Department of Health Services. He worked for the department and for the California Environmental Protection Agency on groundwater mitigation, Superfund sites and risk assessment until 2000.

== International Institute of Bengal and Himalayan Basins ==
Ghosh began organizing water quality initiatives under an organization called GRA International, which organized symposia in India and Bangladesh on toxic chemicals in the Bengal Basin from 1999. By 2001 the organization was renamed the International Institute of Bengal Basin (IIBB), co-founded by Nobel laureates Glenn T. Seaborg and Charles H. Townes. The idea for the institute was proposed by the Nobel Prize-winning chemist Linus Pauling while working with Ghosh at Stanford. The institute's name and scope was later expanded to International Institute of the Bengal and Himalayan Basins, with a stated mission of watershed management and the remediation of contaminated water in both California and on the Indian subcontinent.

Townes was a long-time supporter of the institute. He gave the keynote address at its 2002 convention in Berkeley, and his papers at the Library of Congress include three folders of material on Ghosh's work from 2000 to 2014. Ghosh has held the title Charles Townes Professor of Water Chemistry since 2007.

The institute held an annual "Townes and Tagore" seminar at the University of California, Berkeley, with participation from Nobel laureates Douglas Osheroff and Randy Schekman. Its vice-chairman, the agronomist Aftab uz Zaman of Bidhan Chandra Krishi Viswavidyalaya, organized a symposium on water and arsenic in Dhaka in December 2004, and Centurion University of Technology and Management in Odisha was host to a conference on "Hydro-Gramin technology" with the institute in October 2017.

=== Arsenic mitigation ===
In April 1999 Ghosh endorsed an arsenic-filtration system that researchers at Stevens Institute of Technology had proposed to the government of Bangladesh. One of its developers had field-tested the system in Bangladesh the previous month at his invitation.

On July 25, 2004, IIBB hosted a seminar in Berkeley at which Sibdas Bandopadhyay of the Central Glass and Ceramic Research Institute (CGCRI) in Kolkata presented an arsenic-removal technology that was then in use at four pilot plants in West Bengal. IIBB had invited the CGCRI researchers to Bangladesh to meet officials, was seeking an independent evaluation of the technology by the United States Environmental Protection Agency, and was encouraging communities to sponsor treatment plants in villages. The technology was developed at CGCRI: a United States patent granted in 2006 names Bandyopadhyay and four co-inventors.

=== Education, culture and human rights ===
On June 1, 2002, IIBB held a convention at Berkeley on the rights of minorities in the Bengal Basin, at which Ghosh proposed a secular university in the tradition of Rabindranath Tagore. Ghosh had come into contact with Sheikh Mujibur Rahman through a friend of his father, the independence activist Trailokyanath Chakravarty. By 2005 IIBB had proposed a sister university of Visva-Bharati University at Kishoreganj, near Bajitpur, and Ghosh had approached a former and the serving vice-chancellor of Visva-Bharati and the former president of Bangladesh, A. Q. M. Badruddoza Chowdhury, about it. In December 2002 IIBB launched the Digital Bangla Project, a campaign to raise $30,000 to make BornoSoft's Bengali word-processing software a free download.

== Hydrogrameen ==
Hydrogrameen (also written HydroGramin) is a proposed technology by Ghosh and his institute that combines water storage and aquifer recharge with a cooperative settlement model, developed during IIBB's work in the Bengal Basin, Great Britain and California, at first under the name "Bengal Basin Working Model"; the invention dates from 2012. The name joins the Greek hydro- ("water") and the Bengali gram ("village"). A 2022 study of managed aquifer recharge sites in southwestern Bangladesh found that processes below ground mobilized arsenic and manganese into the recovered water. Most of the aquifer compaction that results from historically low groundwater levels is irreversible.

The hydrogrameen design is a complex of villages around a central reservoir. The reservoir, of up to 3 square miles (8 km^{2}), is fed by rivers and rain. It lies within sloped embankment dams, with a stone cover and an impervious lining, where injection tubes carry water to shallow and confined aquifers. The model provides for subsidized housing and technical training of villagers who maintain the water resource for the purpose of communal farming and fisheries.

The institute plans a two-year pilot project in the Napa Valley of California and prepared a proposal to the Environmental Protection Agency for technical assistance to the owners of private wells, with Ghosh as principal investigator. In 2017 it applied to register HYDROGRAMEEN as a United States trademark, but the application was abandoned in 2020 because no statement of use was filed. A 2019 article by Somnath Roy Choudhury in the journal Remarking An Analisation discussed the concept as a strategy for water management.

== Berkeley property dispute ==
Ghosh owned a property in Berkeley with two buildings, one of which housed the institute. In 1999 the city claimed the property had an illegal addition and declared it a public nuisance. Ghosh's challenges were unsuccessful, and the California Court of Appeal affirmed injunctions against him in 2003 and 2005. In February 2011 the superior court appointed a receiver and the property was sold in 2012, and the receiver was discharged in 2015. Ghosh maintained that the proceedings were discriminatory and that the property was sold below its market value. In April 2012, Charles Townes wrote an appeal to the city attorney on behalf of Ghosh. The Court of Appeal rejected Ghosh's challenge in 2013, and a federal district court upheld the ruling in 2015.

In his November 2018 petition for a writ of certiorari to the U.S. Supreme Court, Ghosh stated that the receiver had requested a $178,000 deposit, of which he paid $160,000 in cash and $17,000 in building permit fees. He also stated that the City collected $6,000 in boarding-up costs from his lender, and an additional $40,000 in professional services fees. According to Ghosh, the receiver subsequently sold the property without returning the money he had paid toward its repair and preservation. The Supreme Court of the United States denied Ghosh's petitions for review in 2014 and 2019.

== Senate candidacy and later activities ==
Ghosh was a candidate in the June 5, 2018, primary election for the United States Senate seat in California, with no party preference and the ballot designation "Water Scientist/Professor". Friends and neighbors in Berkeley encouraged him to run and collected the signatures. He received 12,557 votes (0.2%) and did not advance to the general election.

In 2020 Ghosh founded Dr. Ghosh Science & Technology at his home in Osmanpur. It gives free training in computing, sewing, English and environmental science to about 250 students each year. On November 11, 2023, he organized a seminar at the National Press Club in Dhaka on the pollution of the Buriganga River and on Hydrogrameen.

Ghosh is chairman of a committee that campaigns for Bajitpur to become a separate district; the campaign's plans include a water research center on the Ghorautra River. He took part in a press conference for the demand at the National Press Club on August 1, 2025.

== Selected works ==
- Ghosh, Rash Bihari (1979). An ecological investigation of the invertebrates of the Mersey estuary (PhD thesis). University of Salford.
- Ghose, R. B. (1980). "The littoral macro-invertebrates". In Pugh-Thomas, M. (ed.). The Ecology of the Mersey Estuary. Manchester: University of Salford for North West Water Authority. pp. 62–115.
- Pugh-Thomas and Rash Bihari Ghose Ecology of the Mersey Estuary: a polluted estuary of the Northwest England UK . Proceedings of the conference Marine Environment and pollution Kuwait. 7-9 February 1982 pp 219-230.
- Ghosh, Rash B. (1983). Aquatic Habitat and Water Quality Monitoring of the South San Francisco Bay: Technical Proposal (Report).
- Ghosh, Rash B. (c. 1984). Review of Literature Relevant to Aquatic Habitat and Water Quality Monitoring of the South San Francisco Bay (Report).
- Meng, Xiaoguang, Korfiatis, George P., & Ghosh, Rash Bihari (2001). Field demonstration of arsenic removal by the Stevens Family Filtration System (SFFS) in Banglandesh. Center for Environmental Engineering, Stevens Institute of Technology & Ghosh Research Associates.
