= John R. Kirtley =

American physicist (born 1949)

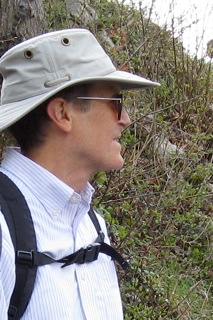
- John Kirtley in profile
- Born: John Robert Kirtley; August 27, 1949 (age 76); Palo Alto, California, United States
- Education: University of California, Santa Barbara (B.A. 1971, Ph.D. 1976)
- Known for: Scanning SQUID microscopy
- Spouse: Kathryn Barr Kirtley
- Children: David Barr Kirtley
- Awards: Oliver E. Buckley Condensed Matter Prize (1998)
- Scientific career
- Fields: Condensed matter physics
- Institutions: Stanford University
- Doctoral advisor: Paul K. Hansma
- Website: kirtleyscientific.com

John Robert Kirtley (born August 27, 1949) is an American condensed matter physicist and a consulting professor at the Center for Probing the Nanoscale in the department of applied physics at Stanford University. He shared the 1998 Oliver E. Buckley Prize of the American Physical Society, and is a Fellow of both the American Physical Society and the American Association for the Advancement of Science.

== Early life and education ==
He received his BA in physics in 1971 and his PhD in physics in 1976, both from the University of California, Santa Barbara. His PhD topic was inelastic electron tunneling spectroscopy, with Paul Hansma as his thesis advisor. He was then a research assistant professor at the University of Pennsylvania from 1976 to 1978, working in the group of Donald N. Langenberg on non-equilibrium superconductivity. From 1978 to 2006 he was a research staff member at the IBM Thomas J. Watson Research Center in Yorktown Heights, New York. Since 2006 he has worked at the University of Twente in the Netherlands, been an Alexander von Humboldt Foundation Forschungspreis winner at the University of Augsburg in Germany, a Jubileum Professor at Chalmers University of Technology in Sweden, and currently holds a Chaire d'Excellence from the NanoSciences Fondation in Grenoble, France.

== Career ==
He has worked in the fields of Surface Enhanced Raman scattering, light emission from tunnel junctions and electron injection devices, noise in semiconducting devices, scanning tunneling microscopy and scanning SQUID microscopy. He is married to Kathryn Barr Kirtley, who received her PhD from UCSB in quantum chemistry in 1977. They have one son, the writer David Barr Kirtley.

Kirtley shared the 1998 Oliver E. Buckley Prize with C.C. Tsuei, Donald Ginsberg, and D.J. van Harlingen. The citation was for "using phase-sensitive experiments in the elucidation of the orbital symmetry of the pairing function in high-Tc superconductors". Kirtley, Tsuei, and co-workers used scanning SQUID imaging of the half-integer flux quantum effect in tricrystal samples to demonstrate that cuprate high temperature superconductors have predominantly d-wave pairing symmetry.
