= Oliver E. Buckley Prize =

American award in condensed matter physics

The Oliver E. Buckley Condensed Matter Prize is an annual award given by the American Physical Society "to recognize and encourage outstanding theoretical or experimental contributions to condensed matter physics." It was endowed by AT&T Bell Laboratories as a means of recognizing outstanding scientific work. The prize is named in honor of Oliver Ellsworth Buckley, a former president of Bell Labs. Before 1982, it was known as the Oliver E. Buckley Solid State Prize. It is one of the most prestigious awards in the field of condensed matter physics.

The prize is normally awarded to one person but may be shared if multiple recipients contributed to the same accomplishments. Nominations are active for three years. The prize was endowed in 1952 and first awarded in 1953. Since 2012, the prize has been co-sponsored by HTC-VIA Group.

== Recipients ==
Year	Name	Institution	Citation (Note: Recipients and citations are sourced from the official APS webpage for the prize and its subpages.)
1953	William Shockley	Bell Labs	For contributions to the physics of semiconductors
1954	John Bardeen	Bell Labs	For contributions to the physics of semiconductor surfaces
1955	LeRoy Apker	General Electric Research Laboratory	For contributions to the understanding of excitation energy in crystals
1956	Clifford G. Shull	Massachusetts Institute of Technology	For his work on applications of neutron diffraction to investigate the structures of solids, particularly those of magnetic solids
1957	Charles Kittel	University of California, Berkeley	For his work on applications of magnetic resonance methods to investigations of the electronic structure of solids
1958	Nicolaas Bloembergen	Harvard University	For his studies of magnetic resonance, both nuclear and electronic and of its uses in the investigation of solids, liquids and gases
1959	Conyers Herring	Stanford University	For his interpretation of the transport properties of semiconductors
1960	Benjamin Lax	Massachusetts Institute of Technology	For his fundamental contributions in microwave and infrared spectroscopy of semiconductors
1961	Walter Kohn	University of California, San Diego	For his extension and elucidation of the foundations of the electron theory of solids
1962	Bertram N. Brockhouse	McMaster University	For his outstanding contributions to the neutron scattering studies of plasma and spin-wave spectra in solids
1963	William M. Fairbank	Stanford University	For his work on the properties of He3 and especially for his part in the experimental discovery of flux quantization in superconductors
1964	Philip W. Anderson	Princeton University	For his contribution concerning many-body and superexchange interactions, which have led to a new theoretical in-sights into superconductivity, liquid He3, plasmons and magnetism
1965	Ivar Giaever	General Electric Research Laboratory	For being first to use electron tunneling in the study of the energy gap in super-conductors and for demonstrating the power of this technique
1966	Theodore H. Maiman	Hughes Research Laboratories	For having been the first to demonstrate experimentally the generation and amplification of optical radiation in solid crystals by stimulated emissions
1967	Harry G. Drickamer	University of Illinois at Urbana–Champaign	For experimental inventiveness, originality and physical insight leading to significant results on the effects of extreme pressures on the electronic and molecular structure of solids
1968	J. Robert Schrieffer	University of Pennsylvania	For his contributions to many-body theory and its application to the interpretation of experiments, especially in the field of superconductivity
1969	J. J. Hopfield	Princeton University	For their joint work combining theory and experiment which has advanced the understanding of the interaction of light with solids
1969	D. G. Thomas	Bell Labs	For their joint work combining theory and experiment which has advanced the understanding of the interaction of light with solids
1970	Theodore H. Geballe	Stanford University	For their joint experimental investigations of superconductivity which have challenged theoretical understanding and opened up the technology of high field superconductors
1970	Bernd T. Matthias	University of California, San Diego	For their joint experimental investigations of superconductivity which have challenged theoretical understanding and opened up the technology of high field superconductors
1971	Erwin Hahn	University of California, Berkeley	For his study of the transient response of solids under the action of electromagnetic pulses
1972	James C. Phillips	Bell Labs	For his synthesis of theoretical and empirical knowledge of band structures and optical properties, and for his use of this understanding to unify the physical and chemical approaches to crystalline bonding
1973	Gen Shirane	Brookhaven National Laboratory	For his broad contributions to the understanding of structural phase transitions by means of inelastic neutron scattering
1974	Michael Tinkham	Harvard University	For his experimental investigations of the electromagnetic properties of superconductors
1975	Albert W. Overhauser	Purdue University	For his invention of dynamic nuclear polarization and for the stimulation provided by his studies of instabilities of the metallic state
1976	George Feher	University of California, San Diego	For his development of electron nuclear double resonance, and the application of spin resonance to a wide range of problems in the physics of condensed matter
1977	Leo P. Kadanoff	Brown University	For his contributions to the conceptual understanding of the phase transitions and to the theory of critical phenomena
1978	George D. Watkins	Lehigh University	For outstanding contributions to the understanding of radiation-induced defects in semiconductors by the imaginative use of experimental techniques and theoretical models
1979	Marvin Cohen	University of California, Berkeley	For timely explanations and novel predictions of electronic properties of solids through the imaginative use of quantum mechanical calculations
1980	William E. Spicer	Stanford University	For their effective development and application of photoelectron spectroscopy as an indispensable tool for study of bulk and surface electronic structure of solids
1980	Dean E. Eastman	IBM Research	For their effective development and application of photoelectron spectroscopy as an indispensable tool for study of bulk and surface electronic structure of solids
1981	David M. Lee	Cornell University	For their discovery and pioneering research on the superfluid phases of He3
1981	Robert Coleman Richardson	Cornell University	For their discovery and pioneering research on the superfluid phases of He3
1981	Douglas D. Osheroff	Bell Labs	For their discovery and pioneering research on the superfluid phases of He3
1982	Bertrand I. Halperin	Harvard University	For his contributions to the understanding of the changes in matter at phase transitions, especially phenomena occur-ring in magnets, superconductors, and two dimensional solids
1983	Alan J. Heeger	University of California, Santa Barbara	For his studies of conducting polymers and organic solids, and in particular for his leadership in our understanding of the properties of quasi-one-dimensional conductors
1984	Daniel C. Tsui	Princeton University	For the discovery of the fractional quantized Hall effect
1984	Horst L. Stormer	Bell Labs	For the discovery of the fractional quantized Hall effect
1984	Arthur C. Gossard	Bell Labs	For the discovery of the fractional quantized Hall effect
1985	Robert O. Pohl	Cornell University	For his pioneering work on low energy excitations in amorphous materials and continued important contributions to the understanding of thermal transport in solids
1986	Robert B. Laughlin	Stanford University	For his contribution to our understanding of the quantum Hall effect.
1987	Robert J. Birgeneau	Massachusetts Institute of Technology	For his use of neutron and x-ray scattering experiments to determine the phases and phase transitions of low dimensional systems
1988	Frank F. Fang	IBM Research	For a series of pioneering experiments which led to fundamental discoveries in the study of two dimensional electron transport phenomena in silicon inversion layers
1988	Alan B. Fowler	IBM Research	For a series of pioneering experiments which led to fundamental discoveries in the study of two dimensional electron transport phenomena in silicon inversion layers
1988	Phillip J. Stiles	Brown University	For a series of pioneering experiments which led to fundamental discoveries in the study of two dimensional electron transport phenomena in silicon inversion layers
1989	Hellmut Fritzsche	University of Chicago	For his seminal transport studies of impurity band conduction near the metal-insulator transition and his leadership in our understanding of amorphous semi-conductors
1990	David Edwards	Lawrence Livermore National Laboratory	For central contributions to the physics of He3–He4 mixtures of liquid and solid helium surfaces, and of spin waves in liquid He3
1991	Patrick A. Lee	Massachusetts Institute of Technology	For his innovative contributions to the theory of electronic properties of solids, especially of strongly interacting and disordered materials
1992	Richard A. Webb	IBM Research	For his discovery of universal conductance fluctuations and the h/e Aharonov Bohm effect in small disordered metallic conductors, and his leadership role in elucidating the physics of mesoscopic system
1993	F. Duncan M. Haldane	Princeton University	For his contribution to the theory of low-dimensional quantum systems.
1994	Aron Pinczuk	Bell Labs	
1995	Rolf Landauer	IBM Research	For his invention of the scattering theory approach to the analysis and modeling of electronic transport.
1996	Charles Pence Slichter	University of Illinois at Urbana–Champaign	For his original and creative applications of the magnetic resonance techniques to elucidate the microscopic properties of condensed matter systems including, especially, superconductors.
1997	James S. Langer	University of California, Santa Barbara	For contributions to the theory of the kinetics of phase transitions particularly as applied to nucleation and dendritic growth.
1998	Dale J. van Harlingen	University of Illinois at Urbana–Champaign	For using phase-sensitive experiments in the elucidation of the orbital symmetry of the pairing function in high-Tc superconductors.
1998	Donald M. Ginsberg	University of Illinois at Urbana–Champaign	For using phase-sensitive experiments in the elucidation of the orbital symmetry of the pairing function in high-Tc superconductors.
1998	John R. Kirtley	IBM Research	For using phase-sensitive experiments in the elucidation of the orbital symmetry of the pairing function in high-Tc superconductors.
1998	Chang C. Tsuei	IBM Research	For using phase-sensitive experiments in the elucidation of the orbital symmetry of the pairing function in high-Tc superconductors.
1999	Sidney R. Nagel	University of Chicago	For his innovative studies of disordered systems ranging from structural glasses to granular materials.
2000	Gerald J. Dolan	Immunicon Corporation	For pioneering contributions to single electron effects in mesoscopic systems.
2000	Theodore A. Fulton	Bell Labs	For pioneering contributions to single electron effects in mesoscopic systems.
2000	Marc A. Kastner	Massachusetts Institute of Technology	For pioneering contributions to single electron effects in mesoscopic systems.
2001	Alan Harold Luther	Nordic Institute for Theoretical Physics	For fundamental contribution to the theory of interacting electrons in one dimension.
2001	Victor John Emery	Brookhaven National Laboratory	For fundamental contribution to the theory of interacting electrons in one dimension.
2002	Jainendra Jain	Pennsylvania State University	For theoretical and experimental work establishing the composite fermion model for the half-filled Landau level and other quantized Hall systems.
2002	Nicholas Read	Yale University	For theoretical and experimental work establishing the composite fermion model for the half-filled Landau level and other quantized Hall systems.
2002	Robert Willett	Bell Labs	For theoretical and experimental work establishing the composite fermion model for the half-filled Landau level and other quantized Hall systems.
2003	Boris Altshuler	Columbia University	For fundamental contributions to the understanding of the quantum mechanics of electrons in random potentials and confined geometries, including pioneering work on the interplay of interactions and disorder.
2004	Tom C. Lubensky	University of Pennsylvania	For seminal contributions to the theory of condensed matter systems including the prediction and elucidation of the properties of new, partially ordered phases of complex materials.
2004	David R. Nelson	Harvard University	For seminal contributions to the theory of condensed matter systems including the prediction and elucidation of the properties of new, partially ordered phases of complex materials.
2005	David Awschalom	University of California, Santa Barbara	For fundamental contributions to experimental studies of quantum spin dynamics and spin coherence in condensed matter systems.
2005	Myriam Sarachik	City University of New York	For fundamental contributions to experimental studies of quantum spin dynamics and spin coherence in condensed matter systems.
2005	Gabriel Aeppli	London Centre for Nanotechnology	For fundamental contributions to experimental studies of quantum spin dynamics and spin coherence in condensed matter systems.
2006	Noel A. Clark	University of Colorado, Boulder	For groundbreaking experimental and theoretical contributions to the fundamental science and applications of liquid crystals, particularly their ferroelectric and chiral properties.
2006	Robert Meyer	Brandeis University	For groundbreaking experimental and theoretical contributions to the fundamental science and applications of liquid crystals, particularly their ferroelectric and chiral properties.
2007	James P. Eisenstein	California Institute of Technology	For fundamental experimental and theoretical research on correlated many-electron states in low-dimensional systems.
2007	Steven M. Girvin	Yale University	For fundamental experimental and theoretical research on correlated many-electron states in low-dimensional systems.
2007	Allan H. MacDonald	University of Texas, Austin	For fundamental experimental and theoretical research on correlated many-electron states in low-dimensional systems.
2008	Mildred Dresselhaus	Massachusetts Institute of Technology	For pioneering contributions to the understanding of electronic properties of materials, especially novel forms of carbon.
2009	Jagadeesh Moodera	Massachusetts Institute of Technology	For pioneering work in the field of spin-dependent tunneling and for the application of these phenomena to the field of magnetoelectronics.
2009	Paul Tedrow	Massachusetts Institute of Technology	For pioneering work in the field of spin-dependent tunneling and for the application of these phenomena to the field of magnetoelectronics.
2009	Robert Meservey	Massachusetts Institute of Technology	For pioneering work in the field of spin-dependent tunneling and for the application of these phenomena to the field of magnetoelectronics.
2009	Terunobu Miyazaki	Tohoku University	For pioneering work in the field of spin-dependent tunneling and for the application of these phenomena to the field of magnetoelectronics.
2010	Alan L. Mackay	Birkbeck College, University of London	For pioneering contributions to the theory of quasicrystals, including the prediction of their diffraction pattern.
2010	Dov Levine	Technion University	For pioneering contributions to the theory of quasicrystals, including the prediction of their diffraction pattern.
2010	Paul Steinhardt	Princeton University	For pioneering contributions to the theory of quasicrystals, including the prediction of their diffraction pattern.
2011	Juan Carlos Campuzano	Argonne National Laboratory	For innovations in angle-resolved photoemission spectroscopy, which advanced the understanding of the cuprate superconductors, and transformed the study of strongly-correlated electronic systems.
2011	Peter Johnson	Brookhaven National Laboratory	For innovations in angle-resolved photoemission spectroscopy, which advanced the understanding of the cuprate superconductors, and transformed the study of strongly-correlated electronic systems.
2011	Zhi-Xun Shen	Stanford University	For innovations in angle-resolved photoemission spectroscopy, which advanced the understanding of the cuprate superconductors, and transformed the study of strongly-correlated electronic systems.
2012	Charles L. Kane	University of Pennsylvania	For the theoretical prediction and experimental observation of the quantum spin Hall effect, opening the field of topological insulators.
2012	Laurens W. Molenkamp	University of Würzburg	For the theoretical prediction and experimental observation of the quantum spin Hall effect, opening the field of topological insulators.
2012	Shoucheng Zhang	Stanford University	For the theoretical prediction and experimental observation of the quantum spin Hall effect, opening the field of topological insulators.
2013	John Slonczewski	IBM Research	For predicting spin-transfer torque and opening the field of current-induced control over magnetic nanostructures.
2013	Luc Berger	Carnegie Mellon University	For predicting spin-transfer torque and opening the field of current-induced control over magnetic nanostructures.
2014	Philip Kim	Columbia University	For his discoveries of unconventional electronic properties of graphene.
2015	Aharon Kapitulnik	Stanford University	For discovery and pioneering investigations of the superconductor-insulator transition, a paradigm for quantum phase transitions.
2015	Allen Goldman	University of Minnesota	For discovery and pioneering investigations of the superconductor-insulator transition, a paradigm for quantum phase transitions.
2015	Arthur F. Hebard	University of Florida	For discovery and pioneering investigations of the superconductor-insulator transition, a paradigm for quantum phase transitions.
2015	Matthew P. A. Fisher	University of California, Santa Barbara	For discovery and pioneering investigations of the superconductor-insulator transition, a paradigm for quantum phase transitions.
2016	Eli Yablonovitch	University of California, Berkeley	For seminal achievements in solar cells and strained quantum well lasers, and especially for creating the field of photonic crystals, spanning both fundamental science and practical applications of that science.
2017	Alexei Kitaev	California Institute of Technology	For theories of topological order and its consequences in a broad range of physical systems.
2017	Xiao-Gang Wen	Massachusetts Institute of Technology	For theories of topological order and its consequences in a broad range of physical systems.
2018	Paul Chaikin	New York University	For pioneering contributions that opened new directions in the field of soft condensed matter physics through innovative studies of colloids, polymers, and packing.
2019	Alexei L. Efros	University of Utah	For pioneering research in the physics of disordered materials and hopping conductivity.
2019	Boris I. Shklovskii	University of Minnesota	For pioneering research in the physics of disordered materials and hopping conductivity.
2019	Elihu Abrahams	UCLA	For pioneering research in the physics of disordered materials and hopping conductivity.
2020	Pablo Jarillo-Herrero	Massachusetts Institute of Technology	For the discovery of superconductivity in twisted bilayer graphene.
2021	Moty Heiblum	Weizmann Institute of Science	For discoveries, enabled by ingenious experimental methods, of novel quantum electronic phenomena in mesoscopic and quantum Hall systems, including observation and interpretation of one-electron and two-electron interference, charge fractionalization, and quantized heat conductance in fractional Hall states.
2022	Emmanuel I. Rashba	Harvard University	For pioneering research on spin-orbit coupling in crystals, particularly the foundational discovery of chiral spin-orbit interactions, which continue to enable new developments in spin transport and topological materials
2022	Gene Dresselhaus	Massachusetts Institute of Technology	For pioneering research on spin-orbit coupling in crystals, particularly the foundational discovery of chiral spin-orbit interactions, which continue to enable new developments in spin transport and topological materials
2023	Ali Yazdani	Princeton University	For innovative applications of scanning tunneling microscopy and spectroscopy to complex quantum states of matter.
2023	J. C. Séamus Davis	University of Oxford; University College Cork; Cornell University	For innovative applications of scanning tunneling microscopy and spectroscopy to complex quantum states of matter.
2024	Ashvin Vishwanath	Harvard University	For groundbreaking theoretical and experimental studies on the collective electronic properties of materials that reflect topological aspects of their band structure.
2024	Qikun Xue	Tsinghua University	For groundbreaking theoretical and experimental studies on the collective electronic properties of materials that reflect topological aspects of their band structure.
2025	Steven Kivelson	Stanford University	For broad and insightful theoretical contributions that have significantly advanced the understanding of correlated quantum systems.
2026	David J. Bishop	Boston University	For groundbreaking experiments that uncovered the role of vortices in the superfluid phase transition in helium films and observed anyonic braiding statistics of quasiparticles in the fractional quantum Hall effect, thus establishing the significance of topological excitations in two-dimensions.
2026	Gwendal Fève	Sorbonne Université	For groundbreaking experiments that uncovered the role of vortices in the superfluid phase transition in helium films and observed anyonic braiding statistics of quasiparticles in the fractional quantum Hall effect, thus establishing the significance of topological excitations in two-dimensions.
2026	Michael James Manfra	Purdue University	For groundbreaking experiments that uncovered the role of vortices in the superfluid phase transition in helium films and observed anyonic braiding statistics of quasiparticles in the fractional quantum Hall effect, thus establishing the significance of topological excitations in two-dimensions.
2026	John Reppy	Cornell University	For groundbreaking experiments that uncovered the role of vortices in the superfluid phase transition in helium films and observed anyonic braiding statistics of quasiparticles in the fractional quantum Hall effect, thus establishing the significance of topological excitations in two-dimensions.

== See also ==
- List of physics awards
