= Lakoff =

Lakoff is a surname. Notable people with the surname include:

- George Lakoff (born 1941), American linguist and cognitive scientist
- Robin Lakoff (1942–2025), American feminist and sociolinguist
