= Ali Yazdani =

- Born: December 25, 1967 (age 58); Tehran, Iran
- Education: University of California Berkeley (BS); Stanford University (PhD)
- Spouse: Adele Goldberg (linguist)
- Awards: Fritz London Memorial Prize (2025); Oliver E. Buckley Prize (2023); Humboldt Research Award (2013)
- Scientific career
- Fields: Condensed matter physics
- Workplaces: Princeton University

Ali Yazdani (born 1967) is an American physicist who focuses on understanding new quantum phases of matter. He is currently the James S. McDonnell Distinguished University Professor at Princeton University and the co-director of the Princeton Quantum Initiative. Yazdani is known for his research in advancing our understanding of emergent quantum phenomena by the application and development of high-resolution quantum microscopy techniques to directly visualize highly entangled quantum states of matter.

== Biography ==
Yazdani was born in 1967 and raised in Tehran, Iran, prior to immigrating to California, USA. He received his BA in Physics with high honors from UC Berkeley in 1989, and his Ph.D. in Applied Physics from Stanford University. After working as a postdoctoral scientist at the International Business Machines Corporation (IBM) with Don Eigler he started his own independent research group at the University of Illinois Urbana-Champaign before joining the Princeton University's Physics Department in 2005. In 2015, he was named the Class of 1909 Professor of Physics at Princeton and the Director of the Princeton Center for Complex Materials (PCCM), a material research science and technology (MRSEC) center supported by the National Science Foundation. In 2024, he stepped down as PCCM director, became the co-director of Princeton Quantum Initiative and was named the James S. McDonnell Distinguished University Professor.

Yazdani has held visiting professorships at Stanford and at Cambridge University (Trinity College) in the UK and has been a Loeb Lecturer at Harvard. For his research accomplishments, Yazdani has been recognized by several awards and honors, including a Humboldt research award, and has been elected a fellow of the American Physical Society, the American Association for Advancement of Science, and the American Academy of Arts and Sciences. In 2019, he was elected a member of the National Academy of Sciences. Together with Seamus Davis, he was awarded the 2023 Buckley Prize from the American Physical Society.

== Awards and honors ==
- Gordon and Betty Moore Foundation Experimental Investigator since 2008.
- Fellow of the American Physical Society (2009)
- Fellow of the American Association for the Advancement of Science (2012)
- Humboldt Research Award (2014)
- Fellow of the American Academy of Arts and Sciences (2015)
- Member of the National Academy of Sciences (2019).
- Oliver E. Buckley Condensed Matter Prize (2023)
- Fritz London Memorial Prize (2025)

== Personal life ==
Yazdani married Adele Goldberg, currently a professor of psychology at Princeton, in 1994 and they have two children.
