= Michael Manfra =

American physicist and academic administrator

Michael James Manfra
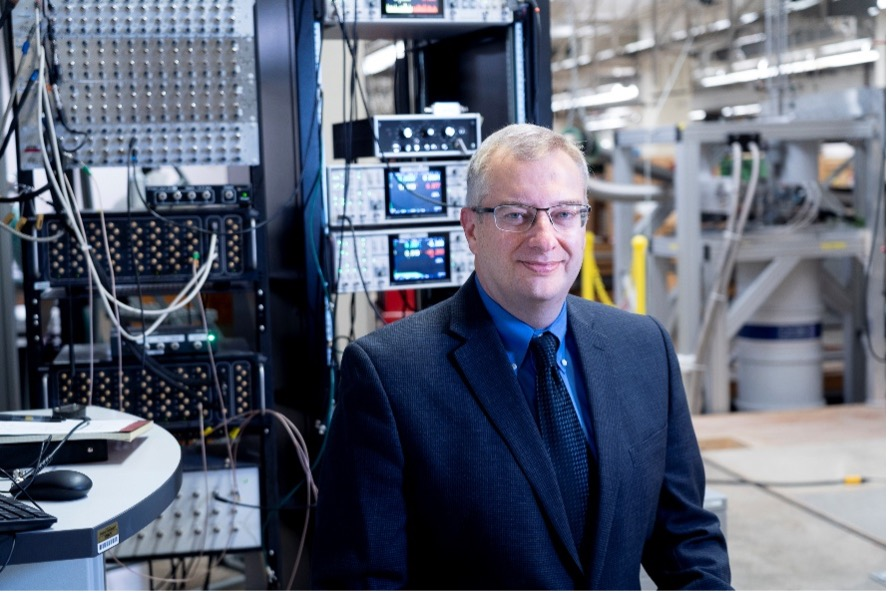
- Born: December 16, 1969 (age 56); Boston, Massachusetts
- Education: Harvard University; Boston University
- Known for: Experimental demonstration of anyonic braiding statistics
- Awards: Oliver E. Buckley Prize (2026)
- Scientific career
- Fields: Quantum computing Condensed matter physics
- Workplaces: Purdue University; Microsoft Quantum

Michael James Manfra (born December 16, 1969) is an American physicist and academic administrator known for his contributions to condensed matter physics and quantum computing. His research focuses on topological phases of matter examined with nanoscale devices that probe strong electronic correlations and topological phenomena, and the development of novel qubit platforms for fault-tolerant quantum computation. He is a recipient of the 2026 Oliver E. Buckley Prize in condensed matter physics from the American Physical Society for experimental work demonstrating anyonic braiding statistics in the fractional quantum Hall effect and advancing understanding of topological excitations in two-dimensional systems.

== Education ==
Manfra graduated as valedictorian from Malden Catholic High School in Malden, Massachusetts in 1988 and received his A.B. in physics, cum laude, from Harvard University in 1992. He went on to earn an M.A. (1994) and a Ph.D. (1999) in physics from Boston University.

== Career ==
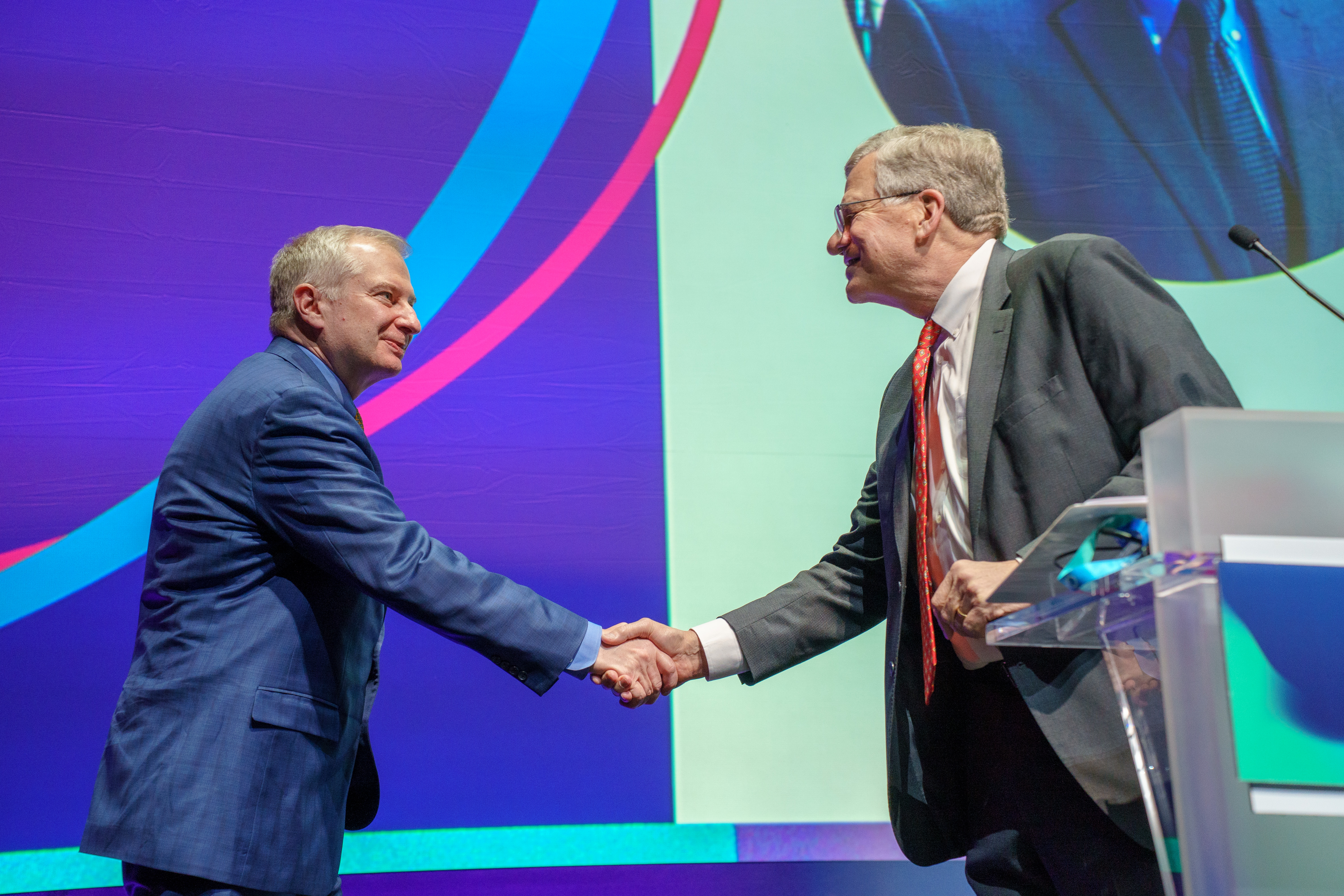
Manfra receiving the 2026 Oliver E. Buckley Condensed Matter Physics Prize from the American Physical Society.

Manfra joined Bell Laboratories, Lucent Technologies, as a postdoctoral member of the technical staff in October 1998 and was subsequently promoted to member of the technical staff in 2001. At Bell Labs, his work focused on molecular-beam epitaxy growth and device physics in low-dimensional semiconductor systems.

In 2009, Manfra joined Purdue University as a faculty member, holding joint appointments in physics and astronomy, materials engineering, and electrical and computer engineering. He was the William F. and Patty J. Miller Associate Professor (2009–2013) and was promoted to full professor in 2013. He has held several endowed positions at Purdue, including his current title as the Bill and Dee O’Brien Distinguished Professor of Physics and Astronomy.

In addition to his academic roles, Manfra has been affiliated with Microsoft Quantum since 2014 as a consultant and has served as Director of Microsoft Quantum, West Lafayette since 2016. In 2025, he was appointed Director of the Purdue Quantum Science and Engineering Institute, and in 2026 he became Purdue University's Chief Quantum Officer and Special Advisor to the President and Provost.

At Purdue, Manfra's research spans novel materials development using molecular beam epitaxy, nanoscale device fabrication, and sensitive electronic measurements at ultra-low temperatures and high magnetic fields with an emphasis on exploration of new qubit modalities.

In 2020, his team at Purdue reported an interferometric measurement of anyon braiding. This discovery earned him the Oliver E. Buckley Prize in 2026.

== Honors and awards ==
- Fellow of the American Physical Society, 2015
- Falling Walls Foundation Berlin Germany, Finalist for Scientific Breakthrough of the Year, 2021
- Arden L. Bement Jr. Award, Purdue University, 2021 for “Outstanding Accomplishments in Pure and Applied Sciences and Engineering”
- Keynote Award: 2023 IEEE 73rd Electronic Components and Technology Conference, Orlando, Florida May 31, 2023
- Invited Lecturer at Quantum Connections 2025– celebrating the 100th Anniversary of the Birth of Quantum Mechanics, Stockholm Sweden, June 2025
- 2026 Oliver E. Buckley Prize, American Physical Society

== Selected works ==
- Direct observation of anyonic braiding statistics
- Interferometric single-shot parity measurement in InAs–Al hybrid devices
- Molecular Beam Epitaxy of Ultra-High-Quality AlGaAs/GaAs Heterostructures: Enabling Physics in Low-Dimensional Electronic Systems
- InAs–Al hybrid devices passing the topological gap protocol
- Aharonov–Bohm interference of fractional quantum Hall edge modes
- Fabry–Pérot Interferometry at the ν = 2/5 Fractional Quantum Hall State
- Modified MBE hardware and techniques and role of gallium purity for attainment of 2DEG mobility >35×10⁶ cm^{2}/V·s in AlGaAs/GaAs quantum wells grown by MBE

=== Patents ===
- US Patent #6,349,454: Method of making thin film resonator apparatus (2002)
- US Patent #6,494,409: MOS transistor having aluminum nitride gate structure and method of manufacturing same (2002)
- US Patent #6,699,760: Method for growing layers of group III-nitride semiconductor having electrically passivated threading defects (2004)
- US Patent #7,001,831: Layers of group III-nitride semiconductor made with multi-step epitaxial methods (2006)
- US Patent #7,038,300: Apparatus with improved layers of group III-nitride semiconductors (2006)
- US Patent #11211543 B2: Semiconductor-superconductor hybrid device and its fabrication (2021)
- US Patent #11127820 B2: Quantum-Well Field-Effect Transistor and Method for Manufacturing the Same (2021)
- US Patent #11488822 B2: SAG nanowire growth with ion implantation (2022)
