= George D. Watkins =

American solid-state physicist (1924–2026)

George Daniels Watkins (April 28, 1924 – October 22, 2026) was an American solid-state physicist.

== Life and career ==
George Daniels Watkins was born in Evanston, Illinois on April 28, 1924. He received his bachelor's degree in physics from Randolph-Macon College in 1943. Watkins earned his master's degree in 1947 and his Ph.D. in 1952 from Harvard University with the thesis A R. F. Spectrometer with Applications to Studies of Nuclear Magnetic Resonance Absorption in Solids. From 1952 to 1975 he did research in solid state physics at the General Electric Research Laboratory in Schenectady, New York. During his time at General Electric, he was also an adjunct professor at Rensselaer Polytechnic Institute from 1962 to 1965 and at the State University of New York, Albany from 1969 to 1973. From 1975 until his retirement in 1996, he was "Sherman Fairchild Professor for Physics'" at Lehigh University.

He conducted research on "the physics of defects in solids, radiation damage, electronic structure of deep levels in semiconductors, nuclear and electron paramagnetic resonance, optical spectroscopy, optical detection of magnetic resonance, and deep level transient capacitance spectroscopy of point defects in solids." His research focused on defects in semiconductors (including defects caused by radiation) and exploration of such defects with magnetic resonance techniques (electron spin resonance and electron nuclear double resonance).

In 1966/67 he was a visiting scientist at the University of Oxford (Clarendon Laboratory) as a Fellow of the National Science Foundation and in 1983/84 at the Max Planck Institute for Solid State Research in Stuttgart as U.S. Senior Scientist of the Alexander von Humboldt Foundation. In 1990/91 he was a visiting professor for three months each at the University of Lund, King's College London, and Fraunhofer Institute for Applied Solid State Physics (Fraunhofer-Institut für Angewandte Festkörperphysik — IAF) in Freiburg im Breisgau.

In 1978 Watkins received the Oliver E. Buckley Condensed Matter Prize. In 1988 he was elected a member of the National Academy of Sciences. In 1999 he received the silver medal in Physics (Materials Science) of the International ESR/EPR Society.

Watkins died in Richmond, Virginia on October 22, 2026, at the age of 102.
