= Guy Deutscher (physicist) =

Israeli physicist

- גי דויטשר
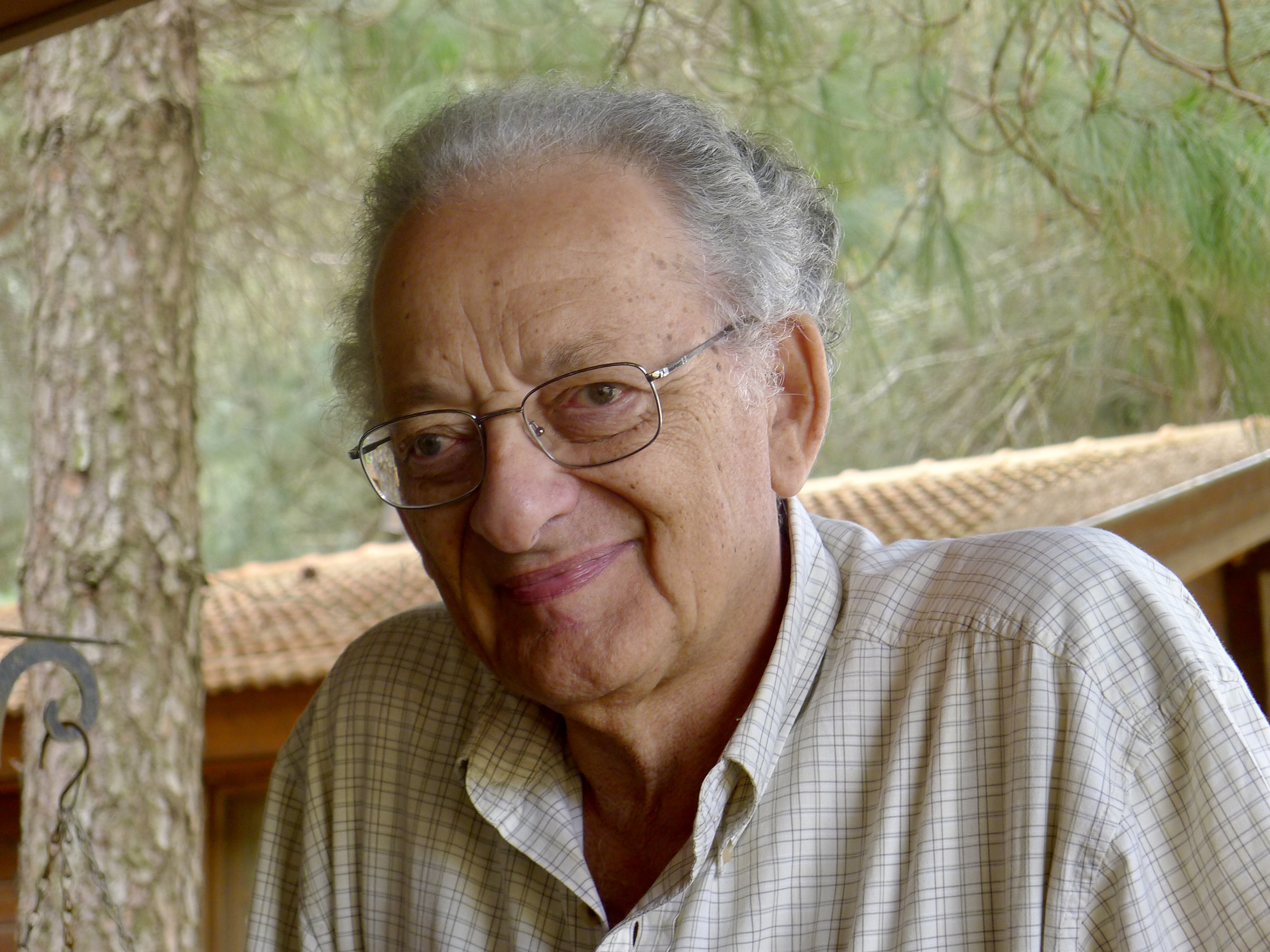
- Born: 19 March 1936; Berlin, Germany
- Died: 5 May 2024 (aged 88); Israel
- Citizenship: Israeli, French
- Education: Paris-Sud (Orsay), France
- Known for: Superconductivity, Proximity effects, Solid State Physics, Fluctuations in Granular Superconductors, Ferromagnet-Superconductor Non-Local Boundary Effect, Andreev Reflection into High-Temperature Superconductors
- Awards: Israel Physical Society Fellow (2018), Fellow of the American Physical Society, Fellow of the Institute of Physics (UK), Ordre des Palmes Academiques (1986) and the Legion d'Honneur (1999)
- Scientific career
- Patrons: Pierre-Gilles de Gennes
- Thesis: Experimental studies of the proximity effects in superconductors
- Doctoral advisor: Pierre-Gilles de Gennes
- Notable students: Zvi Ovadyahu (Hebrew University of Jerusalem), Aharon Kapitulnik (Stanford University), Alexander Palevski (Tel Aviv University), Alexander Gerber (Tel Aviv University), Yossi Lereah (Tel Aviv University), Ralf Krupke (Karlsruhe), Yoram Dagan (Tel Aviv University), Eli Farber (Ariel University), Emil Polturak (Technion), Michael Rappaport (Weizmann Institute of Science), Hector Castro (Bogota, Colombia), Leandro Tessler (Campinas, Brazil), Roy Beck (Tel Aviv University)

Guy Deutscher (Hebrew: גי דויטשר; 19 March 1936 – 4 May 2024) was an Israeli experimental physicist who specialized in solid-state physics, low-temperature physics, and superconductivity. He was a Professor Emeritus of Physics at Tel Aviv University.

== Early life and education ==
Deutscher was born in Berlin, Germany in 1936. His family fled the Nazis in 1939, shortly before World War II, and settled down (first illegally) in Paris, France. In July 1942, he was arrested with his mother at the "Vel d'Hiv" roundup (la rafle du vélodrome d'hiver). Still, luckily because his father was a French prisoner of war, he escaped the fate of most of the other detainees who were sent to their deaths mainly to Auschwitz. After the war, Deutscher completed his Baccalaureat at Lycée Henri IV in 1953. In 1956, he passed the entrance exam and was accepted into the École nationale supérieure des mines de Paris, from which he graduated in 1959 with a Diplome d'ingenieur Civil des Mines, specializing in metallurgy. After three years of military service, he joined the research group of Nobel Laureate Pierre-Gilles de Gennes at the university of Paris-Sud (Orsay). The group was later known as the "Orsay group on superconductivity". It was nicknamed by de Gennes as the four "Musketeers" including Deutscher, E. Guyon, J.P. Burger, and A. Martiner.

== Career and research ==
After spending two years as a postdoc at Rutgers University (1967-8) in the group of Bernie Serin, he returned to France. He was appointed as an associate professor at the University of Paris-Orsay (IUT). In 1971, Deutsche immigrated to Israel and joined the Department of Physics at Tel Aviv University, where he spent his entire career. He developed a new direction of research on experimental low-temperature physics, with particular emphasis on granular superconductors, disordered media, metal-insulator and superconductor-semiconductor transitions properties of thin superconducting films and Josephson junctions. He made contributions to the understanding of vortex dynamics in superconductors and the development of superconducting devices. In addition, he worked on granular and disordered materials with an emphasis on the phenomenon of percolation.

Deutscher published over 300 scientific papers in leading journals. He supervised numerous graduate students and postdoctoral fellows. Many of his students went on to hold prominent positions in academia and industry in Israel and abroad.

== Contributions to high-temperature superconductivity ==
Deutscher's expertise in granular and disordered materials proved invaluable when high-temperature superconductivity was discovered in the late 1980s. He co-authored one of the most cited papers in the field with K. Alex Müller, the Nobel laureate who discovered the cuprate superconductors. This paper explored the relationship between the unique properties of high-temperature superconductivity and the inherent disorder in these materials. Deutscher's insight into the short coherence length of cuprates led to the first accepted explanation for the low critical current in ceramic and polycrystalline samples of these materials.

Deutscher's group also pioneered the use of Andreev reflections to study the electronic properties of high-temperature superconductors. This technique allowed for the measurement of the superconducting gap and provided insights into the nature of the pseudogap in these materials.
