= John Slonczewski =

American physicist (1929–2019)

- Born: July 26, 1929; New York City, New York, United States
- Died: May 31, 2019 (aged 89); Katonah, New York, United States
- Education: Rutgers University, Worcester Polytechnic Institute
- Known for: Theory of magnetism, Stoner–Wohlfarth astroid curve
- Awards: Oliver E. Buckley Condensed Matter Prize (2013); IEEE Magnetics Society Achievement Award
- Scientific career
- Fields: Condensed matter theory
- Workplaces: IBM Research

John Slonczewski (1929–2019) was an American physicist known for his work on spin dynamics in magnetic systems.

== Biography ==
Slonczewski did his undergraduate education at the Worcester Polytechnic Institute in 1950 and started his PhD on "Band structure of Graphite" at Rutgers University in 1958. He then joined the IBM Research center in Yorktown, New York as a staff researcher, where he stayed till his retirement in 2002. Slonczewski is known for his extensive theoretical study of magnetic system, in particular his applications of magnetic tunnel junctions (MTJ)s.

In 1979, Slonczewski co-authored a book entitled "Magnetic Domain Walls in Bubble Materials: Advances in Materials and Device Research".

In 1996 he published a highly influential paper in the field of Spintronics, introducing the concept of spin-transfer torque, showing that spin polarized currents could be used to control the magnetization direction of magnetic electrodes in magnetic multilayers.

In 2012, Slonczewski received the IEEE Magnetics Society achievement award. Along with Luc Berger, he was awarded the 2013 Oliver E. Buckley Condensed Matter Prize by the American Physical Society "for predicting spin-transfer torque and opening the field of current-induced control over magnetic nanostructures."
