= Robert Meservey =

American physicist

Robert Hilton Meservey (April 1, 1921, in Hanover, New Hampshire – June 18, 2013, in Cambridge, Massachusetts) was an American physicist, specializing in condensed matter physics. He is known as the co-discoverer, with Paul Tedrow, of spin-polarized tunneling, which enabled the development of spin polarized scanning tunneling microscopy and other applications.

== Education and career ==
Robert H. Meservey matriculated in 1939 at Dartmouth College, where he was a varsity athlete. He joined the U.S. Army on April 6, 1943, but graduated from Dartmouth before going on active duty slightly later.

After his discharge from the U.S. Army, he worked for several years as a highly successful, independent professorial photographer. He photographed several famous people, including Robert Frost, John F. Kennedy (JFK), and Jacqueline Bouvier, who married JFK in 1953. Meservey's best-known photograph is of Jacqueline Bouvier, descending the stairs at her debutant party in the summer of 1947. When JFK became the U.S. President, the photograph appeared on several magazine covers and also appeared in many later books. Meservey other work included a series of photographs of Dartmouth College and fashion and architectural photography in New York City and Newport, Rhode Island. Several of his photographs were published in Antoinette Downing and Vincent Scully's prize-winning 1952 book Architectural Heritage of Newport Rhode Island: 1640–1915, published by Harvard University Press. Downing and Scully's book contains reproductions of Meservey's photographs of Newport's historic Christopher Townsend House and Job Townsend House.

From 1951 to 1955 Meservey was employed as a physicist at the U.S. Army's ERDL. There he worked on the development, during the Korean War, of night vision equipment and also did graduate study in physics and mathematics at George Washington University. One of his physics professors was George Gamow. In 1955 Meservey became a graduate student at Yale University, where he worked in the low temperature physics group directed by Cecil Taverner Lane (1904–1991). Meservey continued his work on night vision equipment from 1955 to 1960 as a consultant for the Perkin Elmer Corporation, during his graduate study at Yale University. With Lane as his thesis advisor, he received in 1961 his Ph.D with thesis entitled An Optical Study of the Dynamics of Liquid Helium.

He worked from 1961 to 1963 at MIT Lincoln Laboratory. There he co-authored, with David Douglass, an important paper on superconducting tunneling. Meservey was a senior scientist at MIT's Francis Bitter Magnet Laboratory from 1963 to 1994, when he retired. His doctoral students include Jagadeesh Moodera and Paul Tedrow.

In 1995, Meservey, with Jagadeesh Moodera and other team members, discovered large magneto-resistance occurring at room temperature in ferromagnetic-ferromagnetic tunnel junctions. This breakthrough enabled the development of a new generation of "computers with extreme high density drives and nonvolatile magnetic memory/logic devices."

Meservey was elected a fellow of the American Physical Society. In 2009 he received, jointly with Terunobu Miyazaki, Jagadeesh Moodera, and Paul Tedrow, the Oliver E. Buckley Condensed Matter Prize for their "pioneering work in the field of spin-dependent tunneling and for the application of these phenomena to the field of magnetoelectronics."

== Family ==
Robert was the younger son of Arthur Bond Meservey (1885–1952), who was the chair of Dartmouth College's department of physics, and Anne White Meservey (1886–1970). Robert H. Meservey had a sister, Ellen, and a brother, Edward. Edward B. Meservey (1916–2009) also became a Dartmouth alumnus, a ski champion, and a physicist. Edward's wife, Sabra Follett Meservey (1924–1994), was the first woman to formally enroll as a graduate student for a higher degree at Princeton University. The couple met in Istanbul, where they both taught at a girls' school. (She was Barbara Newhall Follett's sister.)

On September 29, 1953, in Arlington, Virginia, Robert H. Meservey married Evelyn Bradford Miller (1931–2014). Upon his death he was survived by his widow, their two married daughters, and four grandchildren.
