= William W. Kirtley =

American anti-death penalty activist

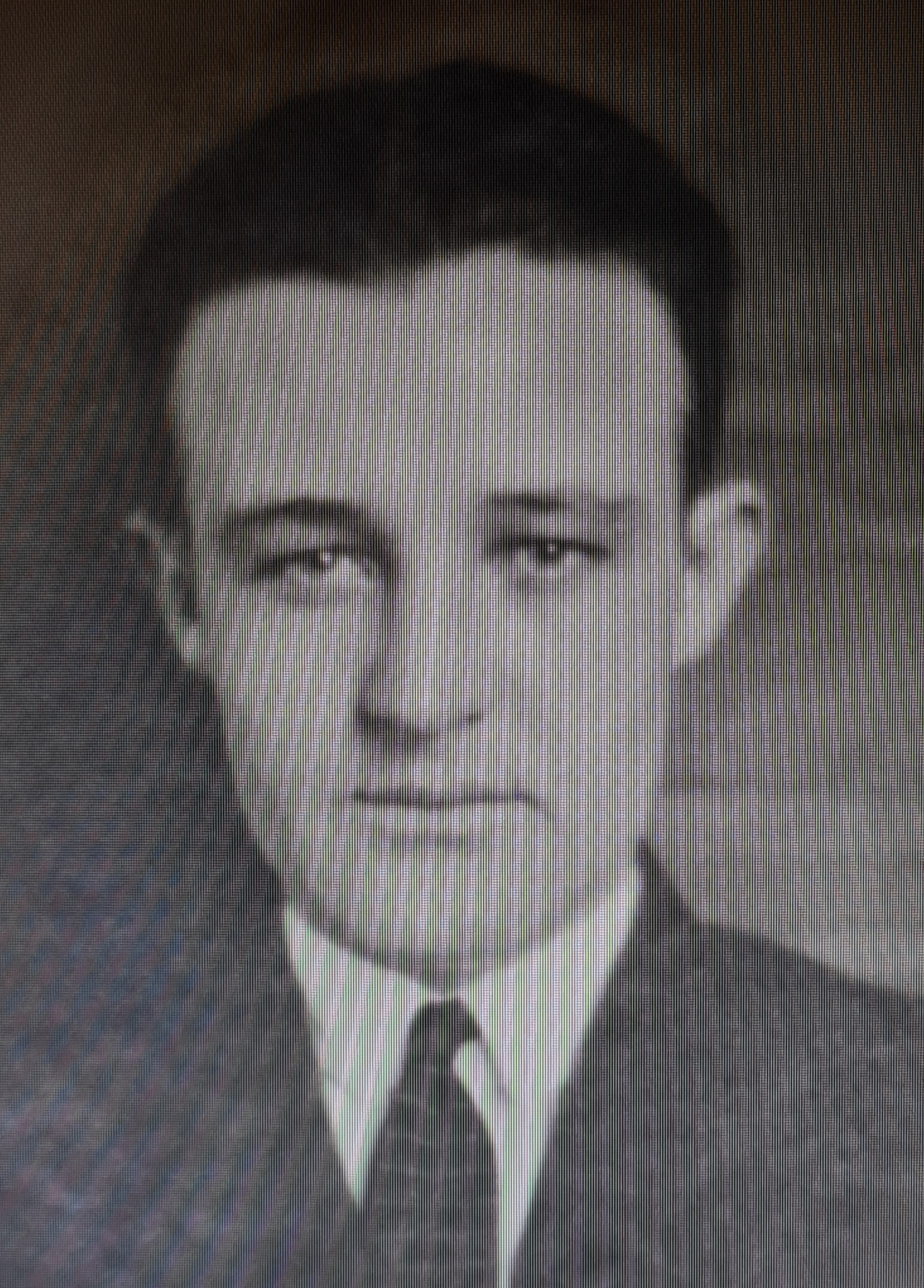
William Kirtley

William W. Kirtley (December 10, 1897 – September 23, 1944) was an American anti-death penalty activist and lead defense attorney to Rainey Bethea, the last man ever publicly executed in the United States. He was also the husband of feminist Louise Gasser Kirtley, the first female Kentucky State Representative (serving two terms, 1962–1966) and first female Kentucky Bar Association President and grandfather of Franco-American international arbitration lawyer William Kirtley. Arguing that capital punishment was the "most premeditated of murders," Kirtley was unable to convince Rainey Bethea to testify on his own behalf, and he was ultimately hanged before a crowd of 20,000 people in what was described as a carnival-like atmosphere, drawing media attention throughout the United States that was fanned by Kirtley and his wife. Afterwards, he sought to have Kentucky adopt a law based on a Missouri statute (L.1919, p. 781) banning all public executions. Following his early death, his wife took up the cause, playing a key role in the Kentucky legislature's ban on all public executions still found in statute KRS 431.220. Many legal scholars and human rights advocates credit the scandal he generated and the execution itself to have led to the eventual ban of all public executions in America.
