= Douglas Osheroff =

American physicist (born 1945)

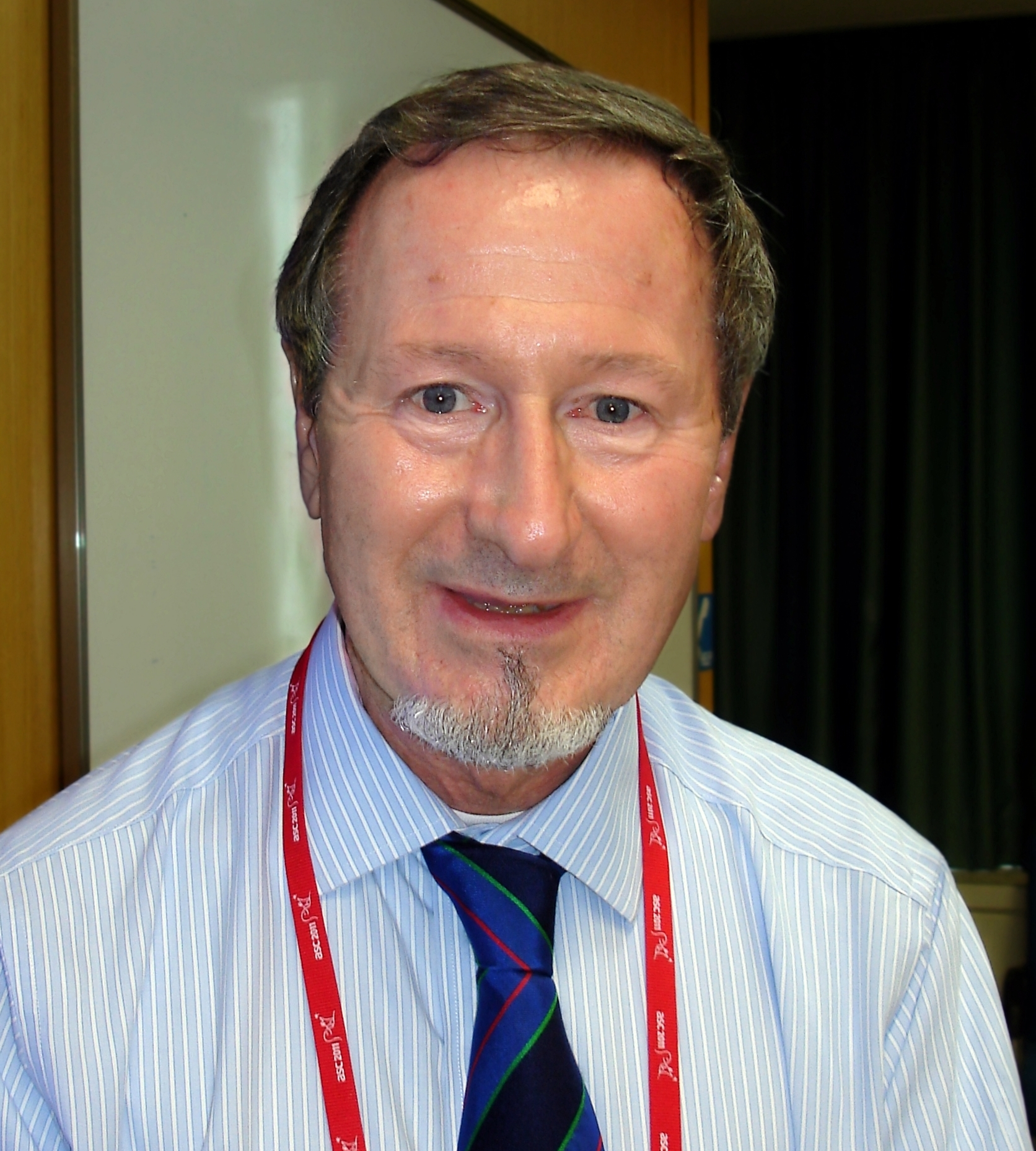
- Osheroff in 2011
- Born: Douglas Dean Osheroff; August 1, 1945 (age 81); Aberdeen, Washington, U.S.
- Education: California Institute of Technology (B.S.), Cornell University (Ph.D.)
- Known for: Discovering superfluidity in Helium-3
- Spouse: Phyllis Liu (m. 1970)
- Awards: Nobel Prize in Physics (1996); Simon Memorial Prize (1976); Buckley Prize (1981); MacArthur Fellowship Program (1981)
- Scientific career
- Fields: Experimental Physics, Condensed Matter Physics
- Workplaces: Stanford University; Bell Labs
- Doctoral advisor: David Lee

Douglas Dean Osheroff (born August 1, 1945) is an American physicist known for his work in experimental condensed matter physics, in particular for his co-discovery of superfluidity in Helium-3. For his contributions he shared the 1996 Nobel Prize in Physics along with David Lee and Robert C. Richardson. Osheroff is currently the J. G. Jackson and C. J. Wood Professor of Physics, emeritus, at Stanford University.

== Life and work ==
Osheroff was born in Aberdeen, Washington on August 1, 1945. His father, William Osheroff, was the son of Jewish immigrants who left Russia. His mother, Bessie Anne (Ondov), a nurse, was the daughter of Slovak immigrants (her own father was a Lutheran minister) from the Felvidék, Upper Hungary, Kingdom of Hungary. Osheroff was confirmed in the Lutheran Church but he was given the chance to choose and decided not to attend any longer. He has stated "In some sense it seemed that lying in church is the worst place to lie. I guess at some emotional level I accept the idea of God, but I don't know how God would manifest itself."

Osheroff earned his bachelor's degree in 1967 from Caltech, where he attended lectures by Richard Feynman and did undergraduate research for Gerry Neugebauer.

Osheroff joined the Laboratory of Atomic and Solid State Physics at Cornell University as a graduate student, doing research in low-temperature physics. Together with David Lee, the head of the laboratory, and Robert C. Richardson, Osheroff used a Pomeranchuk cell to investigate the behaviour of ^{3}He at temperatures within a few thousandths of a degree of absolute zero. They discovered unexpected effects in their measurements, which they eventually explained as phase transitions to a superfluid phase of ^{3}He. Lee, Richardson and Osheroff were jointly awarded the Nobel Prize in Physics in 1996 for this discovery.

Osheroff received a Ph.D. from Cornell University in 1973. He then worked at Bell Labs in Murray Hill, New Jersey for 15 years, continuing to research low-temperature phenomena in ^{3}He. In 1987 he moved to the Departments of Physics and Applied Physics at Stanford University, where he also served as department chair from 1993 to 1996. His research is focused on phenomena that occur at extremely low temperatures.

Osheroff was selected to serve on the Space Shuttle Columbia investigation panel, serving much the same role as Richard Feynman did on the Space Shuttle Challenger panel.

He currently serves on the board of advisors of Scientists and Engineers for America, an organization focused on promoting sound science in American government.

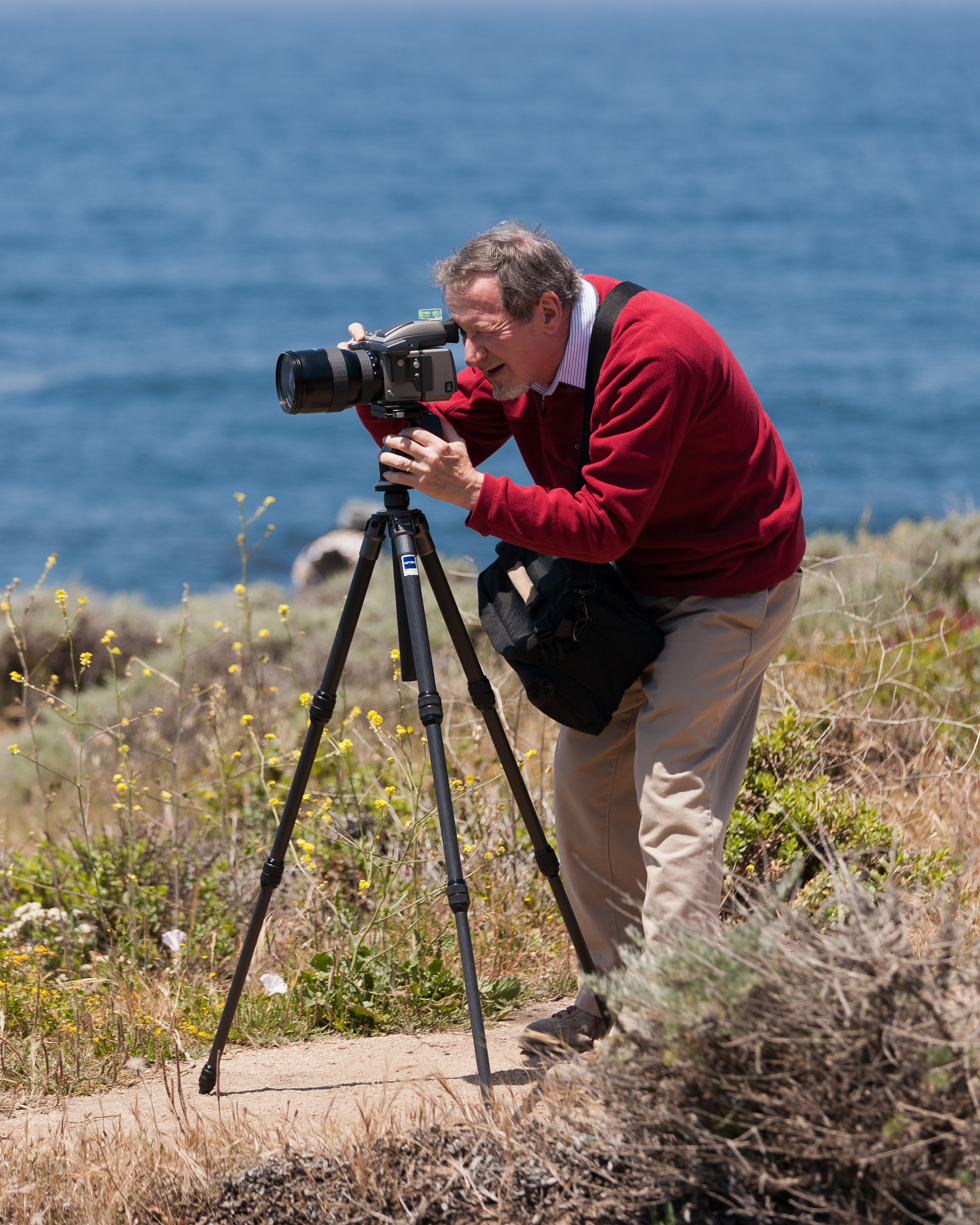
Osheroff photographing during a trip to Big Sur with his students

Osheroff is left-handed, and he often blames his slight quirks and eccentricities on it. He is also an avid photographer and introduces students at Stanford to medium-format film photography in a freshman seminar titled "Technical Aspects of Photography." In addition, he has taught the Stanford introductory physics course on electricity and magnetism on multiple occasions, most recently in Spring 2008, as well as undergraduate labs on low temperature physics.

Among his physics outreach activities, Osheroff participated in the science festivals for middle and high school students, is an official guest of honor at the International Young Physicists' Tournament 2013.

He married a biochemist, Phyllis Liu-Osheroff, in 1970.

Osheroff is one of the 20 American recipients of the Nobel Prize in Physics to sign a letter addressed to President George W. Bush in May 2008, urging him to "reverse the damage done to basic science research in the Fiscal Year 2008 Omnibus Appropriations Bill" by requesting additional emergency funding for the Department of Energy’s Office of Science, the National Science Foundation, and the National Institute of Standards and Technology.

Osheroff is a co-founder and supporter of the International Institute of Bengal and Himalayan Basins (IIBHB), a nonprofit organization in Berkeley concerned with environmental problems in South Asia, led by Bangladeshi-American environmental scientist Rash Bihari Ghosh. During a visit to India in 2012, he advocated for urgent attention to groundwater contamination in the country.

== Awards and honors ==
- Nobel Prize in Physics (1996)
- Simon Memorial Prize (1976)
- Oliver E. Buckley Condensed Matter Prize (1981)
- MacArthur Fellowship Program (1981)
- Golden Plate Award of the American Academy of Achievement (1997)

== See also ==
- Timeline of low-temperature technology
- List of Jewish Nobel laureates
