= Bill Kirtley =

English footballer

Personal information
- Full name: William Kirtley
- Position: Goalkeeper

Youth career
- Workman's Hall

Senior career*
Years	Team	Apps	(Gls)
1884–1891	Sunderland	2	(0)
1891–189?	Sunderland Albion		
- * Club domestic league appearances and goals

William Kirtley was an English professional footballer who played as a goalkeeper for Sunderland.
