= David Lee (physicist) =

Physicist and Nobel Prize winner from the United States

David Morris Lee
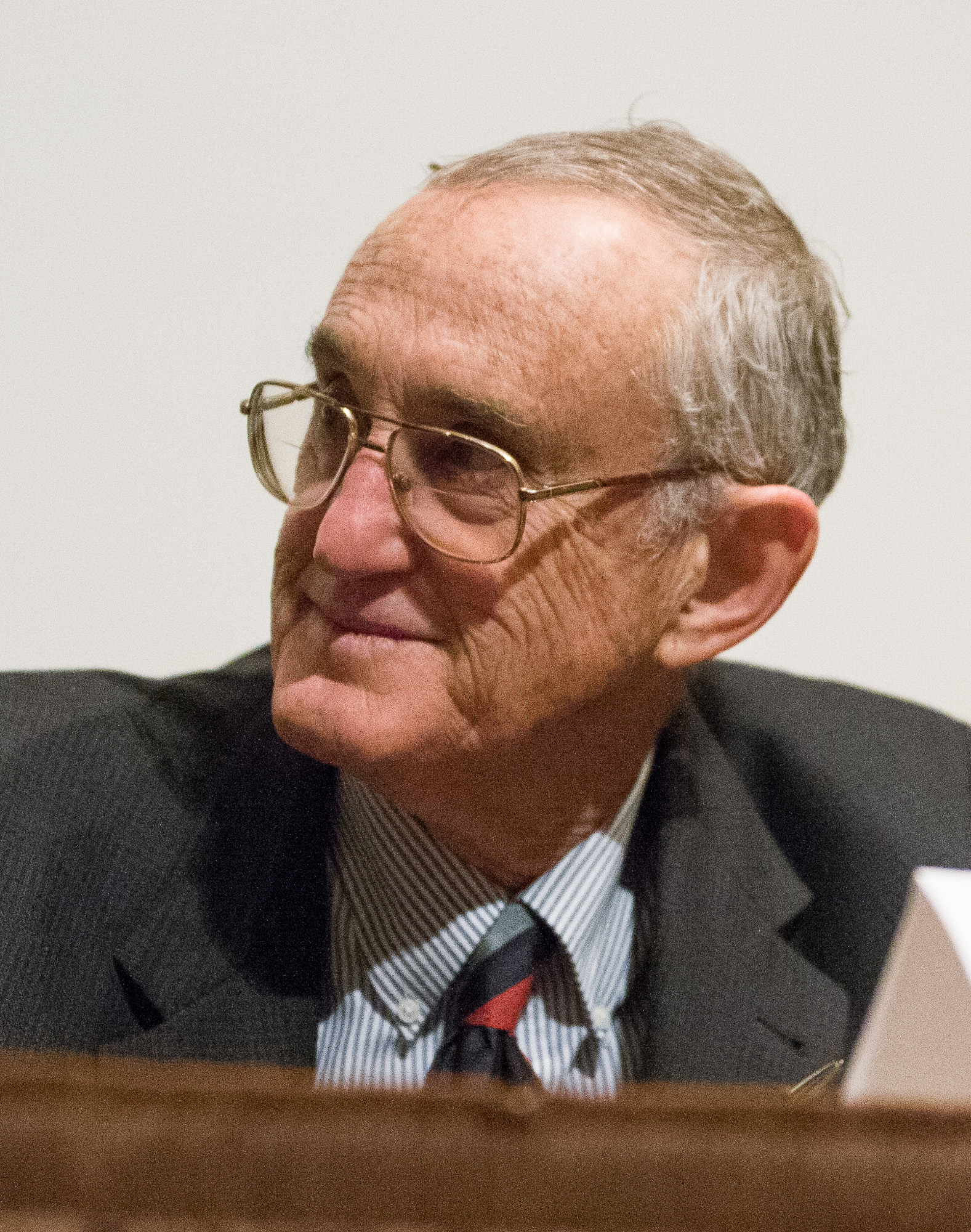
- David Morris Lee in 2007
- Born: January 20, 1931 (age 95); Rye, New York
- Education: Harvard University (BA); University of Connecticut (MA); Yale University (PhD)
- Spouse: Dana (2 children)
- Awards: Nobel Prize in Physics (1996); Oliver Buckley Prize (1981); Simon Memorial Prize (1976); Buckley Prize (1970)
- Scientific career
- Fields: Physics
- Workplaces: Cornell University; Texas A&M University (2009-present)
- Doctoral advisor: Henry A. Fairbank

David Morris Lee (born January 20, 1931) is an American physicist who shared the 1996 Nobel Prize in Physics with Robert C. Richardson and Douglas Osheroff "for their discovery of superfluidity in helium-3." Lee is professor emeritus of physics at Cornell University and distinguished professor of physics at Texas A&M University.

== Personal life ==
Lee was born and raised in Rye, New York. His parents, Annette (Franks), a teacher, and Marvin Lee, an electrical engineer, were children of Jewish immigrants from England and Lithuania. He graduated from Harvard University in 1952 and then joined the U.S. Army for 22 months. After being discharged from the army, he obtained a master's degree from the University of Connecticut. In 1955 Lee entered the Ph.D. program at Yale University where he worked under Henry A. Fairbank in the low-temperature physics group, doing experimental research on liquid ^{3}He.

After graduating from Yale in 1959, Lee took a job at Cornell University, where he was responsible for setting up the new Laboratory of Atomic and Solid State Physics. Shortly after arriving at Cornell he met his future wife, Dana, then a PhD student in another department; the couple went on to have two sons.

Lee moved his laboratory from Cornell to Texas A&M University on November 16, 2009.

== Work ==
The work that led to Lee's Nobel Prize was performed in the early 1970s. Lee, together with Robert C. Richardson and graduate student, Doug Osheroff used a Pomeranchuk cell to investigate the behaviour of ^{3}He at temperatures within a few thousandths of a degree of absolute zero. They discovered unexpected effects in their measurements, which they eventually explained as phase transitions to a superfluid phase of ^{3}He. Lee, Richardson and Osheroff were jointly awarded the Nobel Prize in Physics in 1996 for this discovery.

Lee's research also covered a number of other topics in low-temperature physics, particularly relating to liquid, solid and superfluid helium (^{4}He, ^{3}He and mixtures of the two). Particular discoveries include the antiferromagnetic ordering in solid helium-3, nuclear spin waves in spin polarized atomic hydrogen gas with Jack H. Freed, and the tri-critical point on the phase separation curve of liquid ^{4}He-^{3}He, in collaboration with his Cornell colleague John Reppy. His former research group at Cornell currently studies impurity-helium solids.

As well as the Nobel Prize, other prizes won by Lee include the 1976 Sir Francis Simon Memorial Prize of the British Institute of Physics and the 1981 Oliver Buckley Prize of the American Physical Society along with Doug Osheroff and Robert Richardson for their superfluid ^{3}He work. In 1997, Lee received the Golden Plate Award of the American Academy of Achievement.

Lee is a member of the National Academy of Sciences and the American Academy of Arts and Sciences.

Lee is currently teaching physics at Texas A&M University and continuing his (formerly Cornell-based) research program there as well.

Lee is one of the 20 American recipients of the Nobel Prize in Physics to sign a letter addressed to President George W. Bush in May 2008, urging him to "reverse the damage done to basic science research in the Fiscal Year 2008 Omnibus Appropriations Bill" by requesting additional emergency funding for the Department of Energy’s Office of Science, the National Science Foundation, and the National Institute of Standards and Technology.

== See also ==
- List of Jewish Nobel laureates
- Timeline of low-temperature technology
