= Center for Probing the Nanoscale =

The Center for Probing the Nanoscale (CPN) at Stanford University was founded in 2004 as a collaboration between Stanford researchers and IBM.

CPN is one of the National Science Foundation (NSF) Nanoscale Science and Engineering Centers (NSEC). The goal of the center is to develop and apply novel nanoprobes that dramatically improve our capability to observe, manipulate, and control nanoscale objects and phenomena. Developed technology will be transferred to industry for commercial implementation. Nanoprobe development and applications are under way in five theme groups, focusing on Individual Nanomagnet Characterization, Nanoscale Magnetic Resonance Imaging, Nanoscale Electrical Imaging, Plasmonic Scanning Tunneling Microscopy and BioProbes.

Besides the scientific research activities, CPN members actively engage in public outreach programs to bring nanoscale science and technology to a broad and diverse audience. A Summer Institute for Middle School Teachers is held each summer and gives teachers the opportunity to learn about nanotechnology, engage with scientists, develop course material and get hands-on experience in research labs. Nanoprobe lectures and video recordings from various workshops are also available on-line.
