= Donald Ginsberg =

American physicist (1933–2007)

Donald Maurice Ginsberg (November 19, 1933 – May 7, 2007) was an American physicist and expert on superconductors.

Born in Chicago, Ginsberg attended the University of Chicago, earning a Bachelor of Arts in 1952, a Bachelor of Science in 1955, and a Master of Science in 1956. He then earned his doctorate in physics from the University of California, Berkeley in 1960. He taught at the University of Illinois at Urbana–Champaign from 1959 to 1996, and in 1998 he won the American Physical Society's Oliver E. Buckley Prize for his work on high temperature superconductivity. One of Ginsberg's greatest achievements was creating yttrium-barium-copper-oxide samples; at the time, these were universally recognized as the world's finest samples of yttrium-barium-copper-oxide. Ginsberg shared his samples with the worldwide scientific community freely.

== Achievements ==
Ginsberg is noted for growing purified metallic crystalline compounds called YBCO. During the 1990s Ginsberg edited and contributed to the five-volume book titled The Physical Properties of High Temperature Superconductors. Ginsberg was accepted into the American Physical Society and won the following awards; Sloan Foundation Fellowship, the Daniel C. Drucker Tau Beta Pi Eminent Faculty Award (U. Illinois), University Scholar (U. Illinois), associate in the Center for Advanced Study (U. Illinois), and the Oliver E. Buckley Prize of the American Physical Society. At Illinois, Donald Ginsberg was widely recognized for his outstanding classroom teaching. Thirty-six PhD students did their research under his direction. Donald Ginsberg published more than 240 papers with many hundreds of coauthors at two dozen domestic and foreign institutions.

== Late life ==
To celebrate his retirement, on April 19, 1997, a day-long symposium entitled "Superconductivity with a Smile" was held at Illinois and attended by more than 100 colleagues, former students, and friends, some of whom traveled hundreds or thousands of miles to be there. After his retirement, he wrote several books of poetry, which featured his whimsical observations of physics, physicists, and personal life. He died of melanoma at his home in Urbana, Illinois on May 7, 2007.
