= Robert Coleman Richardson =

American experimental physicist (1937–2013)

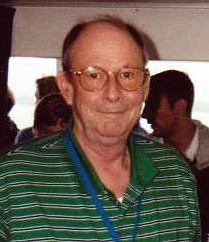
- Born: June 26, 1937; Washington, D.C., U.S.
- Died: February 19, 2013 (aged 75); Ithaca, New York, U.S.
- Education: Virginia Tech (B.S., M.S.); Duke University (Ph.D.)
- Known for: Discovering superfluidity in helium-3
- Awards: Simon Memorial Prize (1976); Buckley Prize (1981); Nobel Prize in Physics (1996)
- Scientific career
- Fields: Physics
- Workplaces: Cornell University
- Doctoral advisor: Horst Meyer

Robert Coleman Richardson (June 26, 1937 – February 19, 2013) was an American experimental physicist whose area of research included sub-millikelvin temperature studies of helium-3. Richardson, along with David Lee, as senior researchers, and then graduate student Douglas Osheroff, shared the 1996 Nobel Prize in Physics for their 1972 discovery of the property of superfluidity in helium-3 atoms in the Cornell University Laboratory of Atomic and Solid State Physics.

Richardson was born in Washington D.C. He went to high school at Washington-Lee in Arlington, Virginia. He later described Washington-Lee's biology and physics courses as "very old-fashioned" for the time. "The idea of 'advanced placement' had not yet been invented," he wrote in his Nobel Prize autobiography. He took his first calculus course when he was a sophomore in college.

Richardson attended Virginia Tech and received a B.S. in 1958 and a M.S. in 1960. He received his PhD from Duke University in 1966.

== Background ==
At the time of his death, he was the Floyd Newman Professor of Physics at Cornell University, although he no longer operated a laboratory. From 1998 to 2007 he served as Cornell's vice provost for research, and from 2007 to 2009 was senior science adviser to the president and provost. His past experimental work focused on using Nuclear Magnetic Resonance to study the quantum properties of liquids and solids at extremely low temperatures.

Richardson was an Eagle Scout, and mentioned the Scouting activities of his youth in the biography he submitted to the Nobel Foundation at the time of his award.

Richardson claimed that he did not believe in an anthropomorphic God, but it is unclear what specific beliefs he held.

== Personal life ==
Richardson was born to Lois Price Richardson, who attained a Master’s Degree of her own before she met and married Richardson’s father, Robert Franklin Richardson, a telephone engineer. He married Betty Marilyn McCarthy, a fellow physics PhD student from Duke, on 29 Sep 1962 at the Immaculate Conception Catholic church in Durham, North Carolina. Together they had two children, Jennifer and Pamela; and four grandchildren Jade, Vanessa, Oliver, and Quinn.

== Awards and honors ==
- Simon Memorial Prize (1976)
- Oliver E. Buckley Condensed Matter Prize (1981)
- Nobel Prize in Physics (1996)
- Golden Plate Award of the American Academy of Achievement (1997)
- Elected member of the American Philosophical Society (2001)

== See also ==
- Cryogenics
- Condensed matter physics
- Timeline of low-temperature technology
