= Geek's Guide to the Galaxy =

Science fiction book podcast

- Genre: Science fiction

Cast and voices
- Hosted by: David Barr Kirtley

Publication
- Original release: January 4, 2010
- Updates: Biweekly

Geek's Guide to the Galaxy is a science fiction book podcast.

== History ==
The show is produced for Wired, and hosted by author David Barr Kirtley. It was created by Kirtley and John Joseph Adams, who served as co-host for the first hundred episodes and is currently a producer on the show. Each episode typically includes either an interview with an author or other media personality, or a moderated panel segment featuring a group of "guest geeks". Season 1 (2010) was produced for Tor.com, the website of Tor Books, a science fiction book publisher. Season 2 (2011) was produced for io9, a science fiction and futurism website owned by Gawker Media. Seasons 3–9 (2012–2018) were produced for the tech magazine Wired.
