= Laughlin wavefunction =

Ansatz in condensed matter physics

In condensed matter physics, the Laughlin wavefunction is an ansatz, proposed by Robert Laughlin for the ground state of a two-dimensional electron gas placed in a uniform background magnetic field in the presence of a uniform jellium background when the filling factor of the lowest Landau level is $\nu=1/n$ where $n$ is an odd positive integer. It was constructed to explain the observation of the $\nu=1/3$ fractional quantum Hall effect (FQHE), and predicted the existence of additional $\nu = 1/n$ states as well as quasiparticle excitations with fractional electric charge $e/n$, both of which were later experimentally observed. Laughlin received one third of the Nobel Prize in Physics in 1998 for this discovery.

== Context and analytical expression ==
If we ignore the jellium and mutual Coulomb repulsion between the electrons as a zeroth order approximation, we have an infinitely degenerate lowest Landau level (LLL) and with a filling factor of 1/n, we'd expect that all of the electrons would lie in the LLL. Turning on the interactions, we can make the approximation that all of the electrons lie in the LLL. If $\psi_0$ is the single particle wavefunction of the LLL state with the lowest orbital angular momenta, then the Laughlin ansatz for the multiparticle wavefunction is

$$\langle z_1,z_2,z_3,\ldots , z_N \mid n,N\rangle
=
\psi_{n,N}(z_1,z_2, z_3, \ldots, z_N )
=
D \left[ \prod_{1 \leqslant i < j \leqslant N}\left(z_i-z_j \right)^n \right] \prod^N_{k=1}\exp\left( - \mid z_k \mid^2 \right)$$

where position is denoted by

$$z={1 \over 2 \mathit l_B} \left( x + iy\right)$$

in (Gaussian units)

$$\mathit l_B = \sqrt{\hbar c\over e B}$$

and $x$ and $y$ are coordinates in the x–y plane. Here $\hbar$ is the reduced Planck constant, $e$ is the electron charge, $N$ is the total number of particles, and $B$ is the magnetic field, which is perpendicular to the xy plane. The subscripts on z identify the particle. In order for the wavefunction to describe fermions, n must be an odd integer. This forces the wavefunction to be antisymmetric under particle interchange. The angular momentum for this state is $n\hbar$.

== True ground state in FQHE at ν = 1/3 ==
Consider $n=3$ above: resultant $\Psi_L(z_1,z_2, z_3, \ldots, z_N)\propto \Pi_{i<j} (z_i-z_j)^3$ is a trial wavefunction; it is not exact, but qualitatively, it reproduces many features of the exact solution and quantitatively, it has very high overlaps with the exact ground state for small systems. Assuming Coulomb repulsion between any two electrons, that ground state $\Psi_{ED}$ can be determined using exact diagonalisation and the overlaps have been calculated to be close to one. Moreover, with short-range interaction (Haldane pseudopotentials for $m>3$ set to zero), Laughlin wavefunction becomes exact, i.e. $\langle \Psi_{ED}|\Psi_L\rangle=1$.

== Parent Hamiltonian and Haldane Pseudopotentials ==
While the Laughlin wave function was initially proposed as a highly successful ansatz, its central role in the theory of the fractional quantum Hall effect was cemented by F. Duncan Haldane, who demonstrated that it is the unique, exact zero-energy ground state of a specific "parent" Hamiltonian. This approach reverse-engineers the Hamiltonian from the known properties of the wave function, providing a powerful theoretical framework and a benchmark for numerical studies.

The construction is based on the properties of interacting particles in the lowest Landau level. In a strong magnetic field, the kinetic energy is quenched, and the physics is dominated by the interaction potential. The states of two interacting particles can be decomposed into states of definite relative angular momentum, l. The core insight lies in the structure of the Laughlin wave function itself: due to the Jastrow factor $(z_i - z_j)^m$, the probability of finding two electrons with a relative angular momentum l less than m is exactly zero. The wave function is constructed to keep particles far apart in a very specific way, encoding correlations in the relative angular momentum channels.

Haldane's idea was to build a Hamiltonian that penalizes any pair of particles that has a relative angular momentum less than m. This is achieved using Haldane pseudopotentials, which can be thought of as a projection of the interaction potential onto states of definite relative angular momentum. The parent Hamiltonian is constructed as a sum of projection operators:

$H_{\text{parent}} = \sum_{i<j} \sum_{l=0}^{m-1} V_l P_{ij}(l)$

where:

- The sum is over all pairs of particles (i,j).
- $P_{ij}(l)$ is the operator that projects the pair (i,j) onto a state with relative angular momentum l.
- $V_l$ are positive coefficients ($V_l > 0$) representing the energy cost for a pair to be found in the l-th relative angular momentum channel. For the parent Hamiltonian, only the $V_l$ for $l < m$ need to be non-zero.

This Hamiltonian is a sum of positive semi-definite operators, so its energy eigenvalues are always non-negative. A ground state with zero energy can only exist if it is annihilated by every term in the sum. This means the ground state wavefunction |Ψ_{0}⟩ must satisfy:

$P_{ij}(l) |\Psi_0\rangle = 0 \quad \text{for all pairs } (i,j) \text{ and all } l < m$

The Laughlin ν = 1/m state, by its very construction, perfectly satisfies this condition. It contains no components where any pair of particles has relative angular momentum less than m. Therefore, the Laughlin state is an exact zero-energy eigenstate of this parent Hamiltonian. Furthermore, for a given number of particles, it can be shown that the Laughlin state is the unique, densest state (i.e., the state with the most particles per unit of magnetic flux) that satisfies this set of conditions. This makes it the unique ground state of this idealized Hamiltonian.

This formalism is extremely powerful. It proves that there exists a local Hamiltonian for which the Laughlin state is the exact ground state, solidifying its physical relevance. It also provides a crucial tool for exact diagonalization studies. The ground state of a more realistic interaction, like the Coulomb potential, can be computed numerically and its overlap with the ideal Laughlin state can be calculated. A large overlap indicates that the Laughlin state is an excellent approximation to the true ground state of the system.

== Energy of interaction for two particles ==
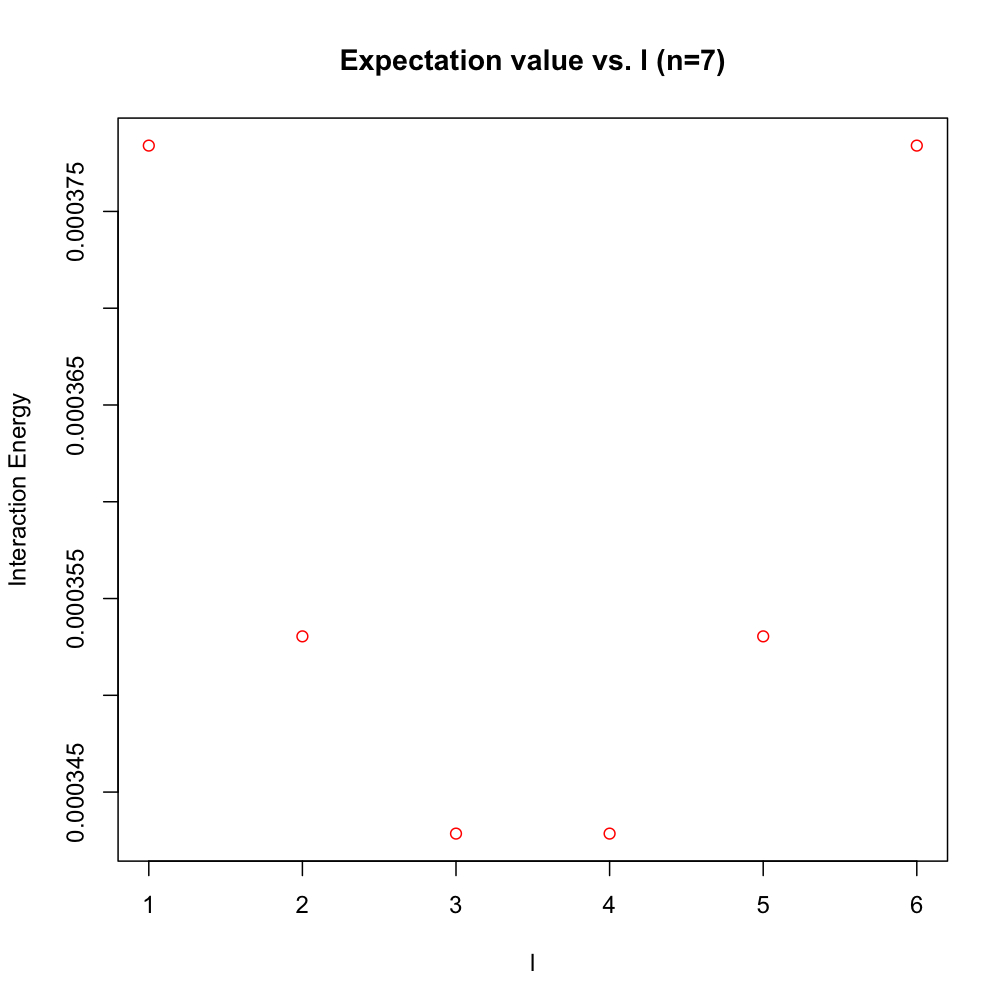
Figure 1. Interaction energy vs. ${\mathit l}$ for $n=7$ and $k_Br_B=20$. The energy is in units of ${e^2 \over L_B}$. Note that the minima occur for ${\mathit l} =3$ and ${\mathit l} =4$. In general the minima occur at ${\mathit l \over n} = {1\over 2} \pm {1\over 2n}$.

The Laughlin wavefunction is the multiparticle wavefunction for quasiparticles. The expectation value of the interaction energy for a pair of quasiparticles is

$$\langle V \rangle
=
\langle  n, N \mid V \mid n, N\rangle, \; \; \; N=2$$

where the screened potential is (see Static forces and virtual-particle exchange § Coulomb potential between two current loops embedded in a magnetic field)

$$V\left( r_{12}\right)
=
\left( { 2 e^2 \over  L_B}\right)  \int_0^{\infty}  {{k\;dk \;} \over
k^2 + k_B^2 r_{B}^2  }
\; M \left ( \mathit l + 1, 1, -{k^2 \over 4} \right) \;M \left ( \mathit l^{\prime} + 1, 1, -{k^2 \over 4} \right) \;\mathcal J_0 \left ( k{r_{12}\over r_{B}} \right)$$

where $M$ is a confluent hypergeometric function and $\mathcal J_0$ is a Bessel function of the first kind. Here, $r_{12}$ is the distance between the centers of two current loops, $e$ is the magnitude of the electron charge, $r_{B}= \sqrt{2} \mathit l_B$ is the quantum version of the Larmor radius, and $L_B$ is the thickness of the electron gas in the direction of the magnetic field. The angular momenta of the two individual current loops are $\mathit l \hbar$ and $\mathit l^{\prime} \hbar$ where $\mathit l + \mathit l^{\prime} = n$. The inverse screening length is given by (Gaussian units)

$$k_B^2  = {4 \pi e^2 \over \hbar \omega_c A L_B}$$

where $\omega_c$ is the cyclotron frequency, and $A$ is the area of the electron gas in the xy plane.

The interaction energy evaluates to:

$$E=
\left( { 2 e^2 \over  L_B}\right)  \int_0^{\infty}  {{k\;dk \;} \over
k^2 + k_B^2 r_{B}^2  }
\; M \left ( \mathit l + 1, 1, -{k^2 \over 4} \right) \;M \left ( \mathit l^{\prime} + 1, 1, -{k^2 \over 4} \right) \;M \left ( n + 1, 1, -{k^2 \over 2} \right)$$

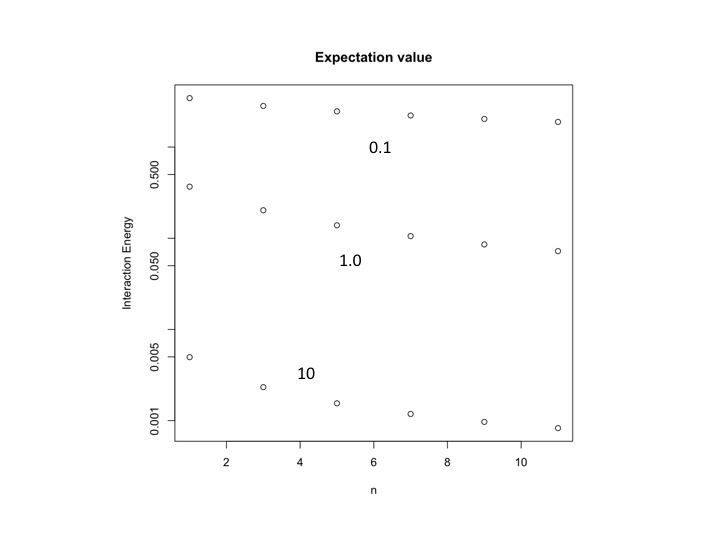
Figure 2. Interaction energy vs. ${n}$ for ${\mathit l\over n}={1\over 2} \pm {1\over 2n}$ and $k_Br_B=0.1,1.0,10$. The energy is in units of ${e^2 \over L_B}$.

To obtain this result we have made the change of integration variables

$$u_{12} = {z_1 - z_2 \over \sqrt{2} }$$

and

$$v_{12} = {z_1 + z_2 \over \sqrt{2} }$$

and noted (see Common integrals in quantum field theory)

$${1 \over \left( 2 \pi\right)^2\; 2^{2n} \; n! }
\int d^2z_1 \; d^2z_2 \; \mid z_1 - z_2 \mid^{2n} \; \exp \left[ - 2 \left( \mid z_1 \mid^2 + \mid z_2\mid^2 \right) \right] \;\mathcal J_0 \left ( \sqrt{2}\; { k\mid z_1 - z_2 \mid  } \right)
=$$
$${1 \over \left( 2 \pi\right)^2\; 2^{n} \; n! }
\int d^2u_{12} \; d^2v_{12} \; \mid u_{12}\mid^{2n} \; \exp \left[ - 2 \left( \mid u_{12}\mid^2 + \mid v_{12}\mid^2 \right) \right] \;\mathcal J_0 \left ( {2} k\mid u_{12} \mid \right)
=$$
$$M \left ( n + 1, 1, -{k^2 \over 2 } \right)
.$$

The interaction energy has minima for (Figure 1)

$${\mathit l \over n} ={1\over 3}, {2\over 5}, {3\over 7}, \mbox{etc.,}$$

and

$${\mathit l \over n} ={2\over3}, {3\over 5}, {4\over 7}, \mbox{etc.}$$

For these values of the ratio of angular momenta, the energy is plotted in Figure 2 as a function of $n$.

== See also ==
- Landau level
- Fractional quantum Hall effect
- Coulomb potential between two current loops embedded in a magnetic field
