= Stationary phase =

Stationary phase may refer to

- Stationary phase (biology), a phase in bacterial growth
- Stationary phase (chemistry), a medium used in chromatography
- Stationary phase approximation in the evaluation of integrals in mathematics
