= Normalized solutions (nonlinear Schrödinger equation) =

Differential equation solution with a prescribed norm

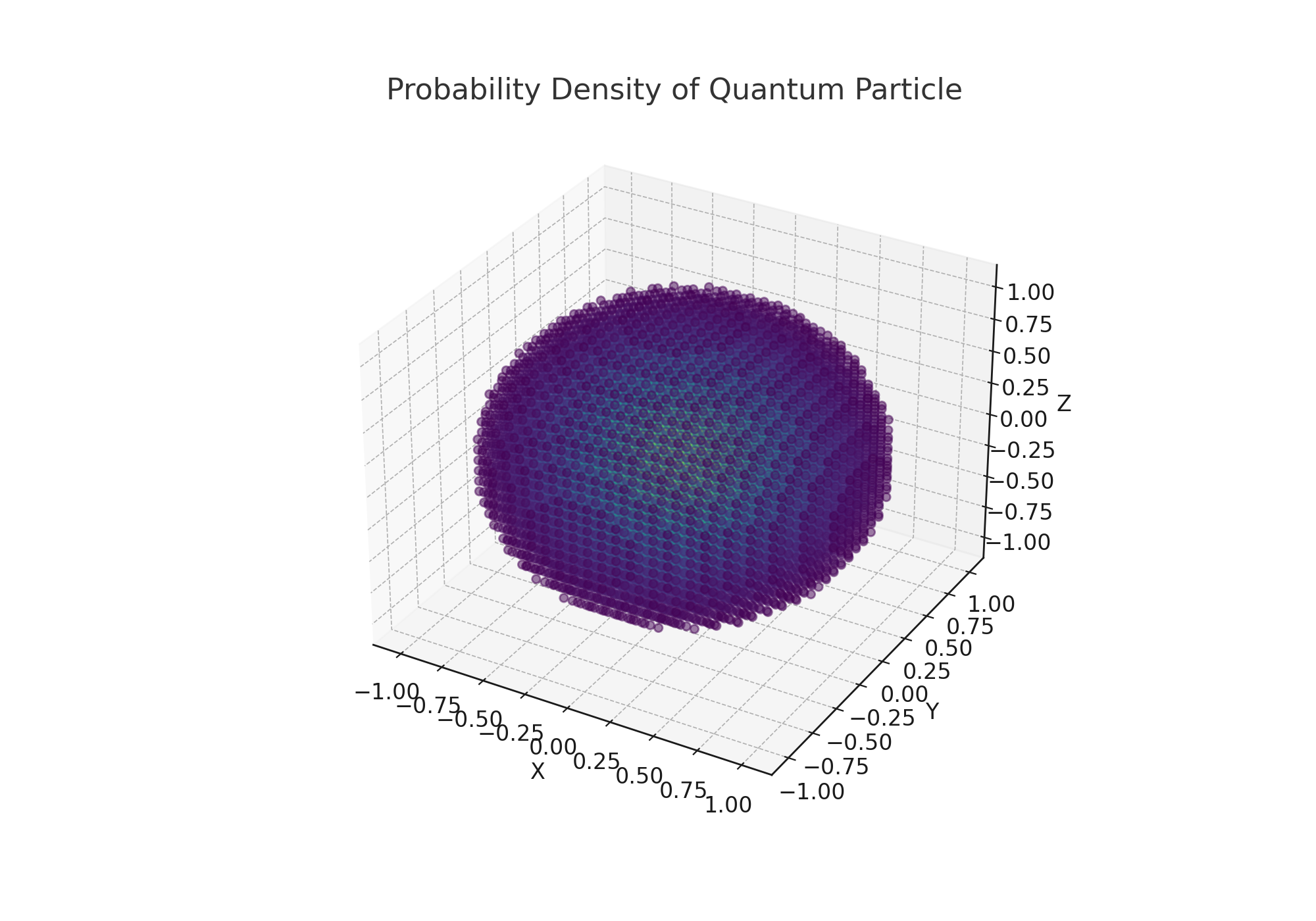
The probability density distribution of a quantum particle in three-dimensional space. The points in the image represent the probability of finding the particle at those locations, with darker colors indicating higher probabilities. To simplify and clarify the visualization, low-probability regions have been filtered out. In fact, the total probability 1 means that the particle exists everywhere in the entire space.

In mathematics, a normalized solution to an ordinary or partial differential equation is a solution with prescribed norm, that is, a solution which satisfies a condition like $\int_{\mathbb{R}^N} |u(x)|^2 \, dx = 1.$ In this article, the normalized solution is introduced by using the nonlinear Schrödinger equation. The nonlinear Schrödinger equation (NLSE) is a fundamental equation in quantum mechanics and other various fields of physics, describing the evolution of complex wave functions. In Quantum Physics, normalization means that the total probability of finding a quantum particle anywhere in the universe is unity.

== Definition and variational framework ==
In order to illustrate this concept, consider the following nonlinear Schrödinger equation with prescribed norm:

$$-\Delta u + \lambda u = f(u), \quad  \int_{\mathbb{R}^N} |u|^2 \, dx = 1,$$

where $\Delta$ is a Laplacian operator, $N\ge1, \lambda\in \mathbb{R}$ is a Lagrange multiplier and $f$ is a nonlinearity. If we want to find a normalized solution to the equation, we need to consider the following functional: Let $I: H^{1}_{0}(\mathbb{R}^{N})\rightarrow \mathbb{R}$ be defined by

$$I(u)=\frac{1}{2}\int_{\mathbb{R}^{N}}|\nabla u|^{2}dx -\int_{\mathbb{R}^{N}}F(u)dx$$

with the constraint

$$\mathcal{M}=\{u\in H^{1}_{0}(\mathbb{R}^{N}): \int_{\mathbb{R}^{N}} u^{2}=1\}, \ \ \ \$$

where $H^{1}_{0}(\mathbb{R}^{N})$ is the Hilbert space and $F(s)$ is the primitive of $f(s)$.

A common method of finding normalized solutions is through variational methods, i.e., finding the maxima and minima of the corresponding functional with the prescribed norm. Thus, we can find the weak solution of the equation. Moreover, if it satisfies the constraint, it's a normalized solution.

== A simple example on Euclidean space ==
An example of the constrained problem

On a Euclidean space $\mathbb{R}^3$, we define a function $f:\mathbb{R}^2 \rightarrow\mathbb{R}:$

$f(x,y) = (x + y)^2$ with the constraint $x^2 +y^2 =1$.

By direct calculation, it is not difficult to conclude that the constrained maximum is $f=2$, with solutions $(x,y)= (\frac{\sqrt{2}}{2},\frac{\sqrt{2}}{2})$ and $(x,y)= (\frac{-\sqrt{2}}{2},\frac{-\sqrt{2}}{2})$, while the constrained minimum is $f=0$, with solutions $(x,y)= (\frac{-\sqrt{2}}{2},\frac{\sqrt{2}}{2})$ and $(x,y)= (\frac{\sqrt{2}}{2},\frac{-\sqrt{2}}{2})$.

== History ==
The exploration of normalized solutions for the nonlinear Schrödinger equation can be traced back to the study of standing wave solutions with prescribed $L^2$-norm. Jürgen Moser firstly introduced the concept of normalized solutions in the study of regularity properties of solutions to elliptic partial differential equations (elliptic PDEs). Specifically, he used normalized sequences of functions to prove regularity results for solutions of elliptic equations, which was a significant contribution to the field. Inequalities developed by Emilio Gagliardo and Louis Nirenberg played a crucial role in the study of PDE solutions in $L^p$ spaces. These inequalities provided important tools and background for defining and understanding normalized solutions.

For the variational problem, early foundational work in this area includes the concentration-compactness principle introduced by Pierre-Louis Lions in 1984, which provided essential techniques for solving these problems.

For variational problems with prescribed mass, several methods commonly used to deal with unconstrained variational problems are no longer available. At the same time, a new critical exponent appeared, the $L^2$-critical exponent. From the Gagliardo-Nirenberg inequality, we can find that the nonlinearity satisfying $L^2$-subcritical or critical or supercritical leads to a different geometry for functional. In the case the functional is bounded below, i.e., $L^2$ subcritical case, the earliest result on this problem was obtained by Charles-Alexander Stuart using bifurcation methods to demonstrate the existence of solutions. Later, Thierry Cazenave and Pierre-Louis Lions obtained existence results using minimization methods. Then, Masataka Shibata considered Schrödinger equations with a general nonlinear term.

In the case the functional is not bounded below, i.e., $L^2$ supcritical case, some new difficulties arise. Firstly, since $\lambda$ is unknown, it is impossible to construct the corresponding Nehari manifold. Secondly, it is not easy to obtain the boundedness of the Palais-Smale sequence. Furthermore, verifying the compactness of the Palais-Smale sequence is challenging because the embedding $H^1(\mathbb{R}^N) \hookrightarrow L^2(\mathbb{R}^N)$ is not compact. In 1997, Louis Jeanjean using the following transform:

$$(s \star u)(x) := e^{\frac{Ns}{2}} u(e^s x).$$

Thus, one has the following functional:

$$\tilde{I}(u, s) := I(s \star u) = e^{2s} \int_{\mathbb{R}^N} |\nabla u(x)|^2 dx - \frac{1}{e^{sN}} \int_{\mathbb{R}^N} F(e^{\frac{Ns}{2}} u(x)) dx.$$

Then,

$$P(u) := \partial_s \tilde{I}(u, s)|_{s=0} = \int_{\mathbb{R}^N} |\nabla u|^2 - N \int_{\mathbb{R}^N} \left( \frac{1}{2} f(u)u - F(u) \right)$$

which corresponds exactly to the Pokhozhaev's identity of equation. Jeanjean used this additional condition to ensure the boundedness of the Palais-Smale sequence, thereby overcoming the difficulties mentioned earlier. As the first method to address the issue of normalized solutions in unbounded functional, Jeanjean's approach has become a common method for handling such problems and has been imitated and developed by subsequent researchers.

In the following decades, researchers expanded on these foundational results. Thomas Bartsch and Sébastien de Valeriola investigate the existence of multiple normalized solutions to nonlinear Schrödinger equations. The authors focus on finding solutions that satisfy a prescribed $L^2$ norm constraint. Recent advancements include the study of normalized ground states for NLS equations with combined nonlinearities by Nicola Soave in 2020, who examined both subcritical and critical cases. This research highlighted the intricate balance between different types of nonlinearities and their impact on the existence and multiplicity of solutions.

In bounded domain, the situation is very different. Let's define $f(s)=|s|^{p-2}s$ where $p \in (2, 2^*)$. Refer to Pokhozhaev's identity,

$$\frac{2 - N}{2} \int_{\Omega} |\nabla u|^2 \, dx - \frac{\lambda N}{2} \int_{\Omega} u^2 \, dx +  \frac{N}{p} \int_{\Omega} |u|^{p} \, dx - \frac{1}{2} \int_{\partial \Omega} |\frac{\partial u}{\partial \nu}|^2 x \cdot \nu \, d\sigma = 0.$$

The boundary term will make it impossible to apply Jeanjean's method. This has led many scholars to explore the problem of normalized solutions on bounded domains in recent years. In addition, there have been a number of interesting results in recent years about normalized solutions in Schrödinger system, Choquard equation, or Dirac equation.

== Some extended concepts ==
=== Mass critical, mass subcritical, mass supcritical ===
Let's consider the nonlinear term to be homogeneous, that is, let's define $f(s)=|s|^{p-2}s$ where $p \in (2, 2^*)$. Refer to Gagliardo-Nirenberg inequality: define

$$\gamma_p := \frac{N(p - 2)}{2p},$$

then there exists a constant $C_{N,p}$ such that for any $u \in H^1(\mathbb{R}^N)$, the following inequality holds:

$$|u|_p \leq C_{N,p} |\nabla u|^{\gamma_p}_2 |u|^{1-\gamma_p}_2.$$

Thus, there's a concept of mass critical exponent,

$$p := 2+ \frac{4}{N}.$$

From this, we can get different concepts about mass subcritical as well as mass supercritical. It is also useful to get whether the functional is bounded below or not.

=== Palais-Smale sequence ===
Let $X$ be a Banach space and $I: X \to \mathbb{R}$ be a functional. A sequence $(u_n)_n \subset X$ is called a Palais-Smale sequence for $I$ at the level $c \in \mathbb{R}$ if it satisfies the following conditions:

1. Energy Bound: $\sup_n I(u_n) < \infty$.

2. Gradient Condition: $\langle I'(u_n), u_n - u \rangle \to 0$ as $n \to \infty$ for some $u \in X$.

Here, $I'$ denotes the Fréchet derivative of $I$, and $\langle \cdot, \cdot \rangle$ denotes the inner product in $X$. Palais-Smale sequence named after Richard Palais and Stephen Smale.

== See also ==
- Standing wave
- Sobolev inequality
- Palais–Smale compactness condition
- Variational principle
- Schrödinger picture
- Mathematical formulation of quantum mechanics
- Relation between Schrödinger's equation and the path integral formulation of quantum mechanics
