= Darwin Lagrangian =

Lagrangian used in classical electrodynamics

The Darwin Lagrangian (named after Charles Galton Darwin, grandson of the naturalist) describes the interaction to order ${v^2}/{c^2}$ between two charged particles in a vacuum where c is the speed of light. It was derived before the advent of quantum mechanics and resulted from a more detailed investigation of the classical, electromagnetic interactions of the electrons in an atom. From the Bohr model it was known that they should be moving with velocities approaching the speed of light.

== Formulation ==
The full Lagrangian for two interacting particles is
$$L = L_\text{f} + L_\text{int},$$
where the free particle part is
$$L_\text{f} = \frac{1}{2} m_1 v_1^2 + \frac{1}{8c^2} m_1 v_1^4 + \frac{1}{2} m_2 v_2^2 + \frac{1}{8c^2} m_2 v_2^4,$$
The interaction is described by
$$L_\text{int} = L_\text{C} + L_\text{D},$$
where the Coulomb interaction in Gaussian units is
$$L_\text{C} = -\frac{q_1 q_2}{r},$$
while the Darwin interaction is
$$L_\text{D} = \frac{q_1 q_2}{r} \frac{1}{2c^2} \mathbf v_1 \cdot \left[\mathbf 1 + \hat\mathbf{r} \hat\mathbf{r}\right] \cdot \mathbf v_2.$$
Here q_{1} and q_{2} are the charges on particles 1 and 2 respectively, m_{1} and m_{2} are the masses of the particles, v_{1} and v_{2} are the velocities of the particles, c is the speed of light, r is the vector between the two particles, and $\hat\mathbf r$ is the unit vector in the direction of r.

The first part is the Taylor expansion of free Lagrangian of two relativistic particles to second order in v. The Darwin interaction term is due to one particle reacting to the magnetic field generated by the other particle. If higher-order terms in v/c are retained, then the field degrees of freedom must be taken into account, and the interaction can no longer be taken to be instantaneous between the particles. In that case retardation effects must be accounted for.

== Derivation in vacuum ==
The relativistic interaction Lagrangian for a particle with charge q interacting with an electromagnetic field is
$$L_\text{int} = -q\Phi + \frac{q}{c} \mathbf u \cdot \mathbf A,$$
where u is the relativistic velocity of the particle. The first term on the right generates the Coulomb interaction. The second term generates the Darwin interaction.

The vector potential in the Coulomb gauge is described by
$$\nabla^2 \mathbf A - \frac{1}{c^2} \frac{\partial^2 \mathbf A}{\partial t^2} = -\frac{4\pi}{c} \mathbf J_t$$
where the transverse current J_{t} is the solenoidal current (see Helmholtz decomposition) generated by a second particle. The divergence of the transverse current is zero.

The current generated by the second particle is
$$\mathbf J = q_2 \mathbf v_2 \delta{\left( \mathbf r - \mathbf r_2 \right)},$$
which has a Fourier transform
$$\mathbf J\left( \mathbf k \right) \equiv \int d^3r \exp\left( -i\mathbf k \cdot \mathbf r \right) \mathbf J\left( \mathbf r \right) = q_2 \mathbf v_2 \exp\left( -i\mathbf k \cdot \mathbf r_2 \right).$$

The transverse component of the current is
$$\mathbf J_t ( \mathbf k) = q_2 \left[ \mathbf 1 - \hat\mathbf{k} \hat\mathbf{k} \right] \cdot \mathbf v_2 e^{-i\mathbf k \cdot \mathbf r_2}.$$

It is easily verified that
$$\mathbf k \cdot \mathbf J_t ( \mathbf k) = 0,$$
which must be true if the divergence of the transverse current is zero. We see that $\mathbf J_t ( \mathbf k )$ is the component of the Fourier transformed current perpendicular to k.

From the equation for the vector potential, the Fourier transform of the vector potential is
$$\mathbf A \left( \mathbf k \right)
= \frac{4\pi}{c} \frac{q_2}{k^2} \left[ \mathbf 1 - \hat\mathbf{k} \hat\mathbf{k} \right] \cdot \mathbf v_2 e^{-i\mathbf k \cdot \mathbf r_2}$$
where we have kept only the lowest order term in v/c.

The inverse Fourier transform of the vector potential is
$$\mathbf A \left( \mathbf r \right)
=\int \frac{ d^3 k}{\left ( 2 \pi \right ) ^3 } \; \mathbf A ( \mathbf k ) \;  e^{i \mathbf k \cdot \mathbf r_1}
= \frac{q_2}{2c} \frac{1}{r} \left[\mathbf 1 + \hat\mathbf{r} \hat\mathbf{r}\right] \cdot \mathbf v_2$$
where
$$\mathbf r = \mathbf r_1 - \mathbf r_2$$
(see Common integrals in quantum field theory § Transverse potential with mass).

The Darwin interaction term in the Lagrangian is then
$$L_\text{D} =
\frac{q_1 q_2}{r} \frac{1}{2c^2} \mathbf v_1 \cdot
\left[\mathbf 1 + \hat\mathbf r \hat\mathbf r\right]
\cdot \mathbf v_2$$
where again we kept only the lowest order term in v/c.

== Lagrangian equations of motion ==
The equation of motion for one of the particles is
$$\frac{d}{dt} \frac{\partial}{\partial \mathbf v_1} L\left( \mathbf r_1 , \mathbf v_1 \right) = \nabla_1 L\left( \mathbf r_1 , \mathbf v_1 \right)$$
$$\frac{d \mathbf p_1}{dt} = \nabla_1 L\left( \mathbf r_1 , \mathbf v_1 \right)$$
where p_{1} is the momentum of the particle.

=== Free particle ===
The equation of motion for a free particle neglecting interactions between the two particles is
$$\frac{d}{dt} \left[ \left( 1 + \frac{1}{2} \frac{v_1^2}{c^2} \right)m_1 \mathbf v_1 \right] = 0$$
$$\mathbf p_1 = \left( 1 + \frac{1}{2} \frac{v_1^2}{c^2} \right)m_1 \mathbf v_1$$

=== Interacting particles ===
For interacting particles, the equation of motion becomes
$$\frac{d}{dt} \left[ \left( 1 + \frac{1}{2} \frac{v_1^2}{c^2} \right)m_1 \mathbf v_1 + \frac{q_1}{c} \mathbf A\left( \mathbf r_1 \right) \right] =
- \nabla \frac{q_1 q_2}{r}
+ \nabla \left[ \frac{q_1 q_2}{r} \frac{1}{2c^2}
\mathbf v_1 \cdot
\left[\mathbf 1 + \hat\mathbf r \hat\mathbf r\right]
\cdot \mathbf v_2 \right]$$
$$\frac{d \mathbf p_1}{dt}
= \frac{q_1 q_2}{r^2} \hat{\mathbf r}
+ \frac{q_1 q_2}{r^2} \frac{1}{2c^2}
\left\{ \mathbf v_1 \left( { \hat\mathbf{r} \cdot \mathbf v_2} \right)
+ \mathbf v_2 \left( { \hat\mathbf{r} \cdot \mathbf v_1}\right)
- \hat\mathbf{r} \left[ \mathbf v_1 \cdot \left( \mathbf 1 +3 \hat\mathbf{r} \hat\mathbf{r}\right)\cdot \mathbf v_2\right]
\right\}$$
$$\mathbf p_1 =
\left( 1 + \frac{1}{2} \frac{v_1^2}{c^2} \right)m_1\mathbf v_1
+ \frac{q_1}{c} \mathbf A\left( \mathbf r_1 \right)$$
$$\mathbf A \left( \mathbf r_1 \right) = \frac{q_2}{2c} \frac{1}{r}
\left[\mathbf 1 + \hat\mathbf r \hat\mathbf r\right]
\cdot \mathbf v_2$$
$$\mathbf r = \mathbf r_1 - \mathbf r_2$$

== Hamiltonian for two particles in a vacuum ==
The Darwin Hamiltonian for two particles in a vacuum is related to the Lagrangian by a Legendre transformation
$$H = \mathbf p_1 \cdot \mathbf v_1 + \mathbf p_2 \cdot \mathbf v_2 - L.$$

The Hamiltonian becomes
$$H\left( \mathbf r_1 , \mathbf p_1 ,\mathbf r_2 , \mathbf p_2 \right)=
\left( 1 - \frac{1}{4} \frac{p_1^2}{m_1^2 c^2} \right) \frac{p_1^2}{2 m_1}
\; + \; \left( 1 - \frac{1}{4} \frac{p_2^2}{m_2^2 c^2} \right) \frac{p_2^2}{2 m_2}
\; + \; \frac{q_1 q_2}{r}
\; - \; \frac{q_1 q_2}{r} \frac{1}{2m_1 m_2 c^2}
\mathbf p_1\cdot
\left[\mathbf 1 + \mathbf{\hat r} \mathbf{\hat r}\right]
\cdot\mathbf p_2 .$$

This Hamiltonian gives the interaction energy between the two particles. It has recently been argued that when expressed in terms of particle velocities, one should simply set $\mathbf{p} = m\mathbf{v}$ in the last term and reverse its sign.

=== Equations of motion ===
The Hamiltonian equations of motion are
$$\mathbf v_1 = \frac{\partial H}{\partial \mathbf p_1}$$
and
$$\frac{d \mathbf p_1}{dt} = -\nabla_1 H ,$$
which yield
$$\mathbf v_1 =
\left( 1- \frac{1}{2} \frac{p_1^2}{m_1^2 c^2} \right) \frac{\mathbf p_1}{m_1}
- \frac{q_1 q_2}{2m_1m_2 c^2} \frac{1}{r}
\left[\mathbf 1 + \hat\mathbf r \hat\mathbf r\right]
\cdot \mathbf p_2$$
and
$$\frac{d \mathbf p_1}{dt} = \frac{q_1 q_2}{r^2}{\hat{\mathbf r}}
\; + \; \frac{q_1 q_2}{r^2} \frac{1}{2m_1 m_2 c^2}
\left\{ \mathbf p_1 \left( { {\hat{\mathbf r}}\cdot \mathbf p_2} \right)
+ \mathbf p_2 \left( { {\hat{\mathbf r}}\cdot \mathbf p_1}\right)
- {\hat{\mathbf r}} \left[ \mathbf p_1 \cdot \left( \mathbf 1 +3 {\hat{\mathbf r}}{\hat{\mathbf r}}\right)\cdot \mathbf p_2\right]
\right\}$$

== Quantum electrodynamics ==
The structure of the Darwin interaction can also be clearly seen in quantum electrodynamics and due to the exchange of photons in lowest order of perturbation theory. When the photon has four-momentum p^{μ} = ħk^{μ} with wave vector k^{μ} = (ω /c, k), its propagator in the Coulomb gauge has two components.

$$D_{00}(k) = {1\over \mathbf{k}^2}$$

gives the Coulomb interaction between two charged particles, while

$$D_{ij}(k) = {1\over \omega^2 - c^2\mathbf{k}^2} \left( \delta_{ij} - {k_i k_j\over \mathbf{k}^2}\right)$$

describes the exchange of a transverse photon. It has a polarization vector $\mathbf{e}_\lambda$ and couples to a particle with charge $q$ and three-momentum $\mathbf{p}$ with a strength $- q\sqrt{4\pi}\,\mathbf{e}_\lambda\cdot\mathbf{p}/m.$ Since $\mathbf{e}_\lambda\cdot\mathbf{k} = 0$ in this gauge, it doesn't matter if one uses the particle momentum before or after the photon couples to it.

In the exchange of the photon between the two particles one can ignore the frequency $\omega$ compared with $c\mathbf{k}$ in the propagator working to the accuracy in $v^2/c^2$ that is needed here. The two parts of the propagator then give together the effective Hamiltonian

$$H_{int}(\mathbf{k}) = {4\pi q_1 q_2\over \mathbf{k}^2 } -  {4\pi q_1 q_2\over m_1m_2c^2 \mathbf{k}^2} \mathbf{p}_1\cdot \left( \mathbf 1 - \hat\mathbf{k} \hat\mathbf{k} \right) \cdot \mathbf{p}_2$$

for their interaction in k-space. This is now identical with the classical result and there is no trace of the quantum effects used in this derivation.

A similar calculation can be done when the photon couples to Dirac particles with spin s = 1/2 and used for a derivation of the Breit equation. It gives the same Darwin interaction but also additional terms involving the spin degrees of freedom and depending on the Planck constant.

== See also ==
- Static forces and virtual-particle exchange
- Breit equation
- Wheeler–Feynman absorber theory
