= Common integrals in quantum field theory =

Common integrals in quantum field theory are set of formulas that are useful for computation of various types in quantum field theory such as partition function, integrals of loop diagrams, etc.

== Gaussian integrals ==
The following Gaussian integrals are useful in calculating path integrals appearing in path integral formulation of quantum field theory:
$$\begin{align}
\int_{-\infty}^{\infty} e^{-{1 \over 2} a x^2+Jx}\,dx &= \left({2\pi \over a}\right)^{1/2}\exp\left( { J^2 \over 2a }\right ),&a,J\in \mathbb C,\,\operatorname{Re}(a)>0\\
\int_{-\infty}^{\infty} \exp\left( i\left( \frac   12 (a+i\varepsilon)x^2 + Jx\right)\right ) dx &=\left({2\pi i\over a+i\varepsilon}\right)^{1/2}\exp\left( -\frac i2{J^2 \over a+i\varepsilon }\right ),&a,J,\varepsilon\in \mathbb R,\,\varepsilon\rightarrow 0^+\\
\int \exp\left(\sum_{i,j=1}^n - \frac 1 2  x_i  A_{ij} x_j +J_i x_i \right) d^nx &= \sqrt{\frac{(2\pi)^n}{\det A}} \exp \left( {1\over 2} \sum_{i,j=1}^nJ_i A^{-1}_{ij} J_j \right),&A,J\in\mathbb R,\,A_{ij}=A_{ji} \text{ positive definite}\\
\int \exp\left(i\left(\sum_{i,j=1}^n  \frac 1 2  x_i ( A+ i\varepsilon I )_{ij}x_j +J_i x_i \right)\right) d^nx &= \sqrt{\frac{(2\pi)^n}{\det{(A+i\varepsilon I)}}} \exp \left( -\frac i2 \sum_{i,j=1}^n J_i ( A+ i\varepsilon I )_{ij}^{-1} J_j \right),&A,J,\varepsilon\in\mathbb R, \,A_{ij}=A_{ji},\,\varepsilon\rightarrow 0^+\\
\int\left(\prod_{i}d\bar a_i d a_{i}\right)\exp\left({-\sum_{j,k}\bar{a}_j(A_{jk})a_k}\right) &=\operatorname{Det}A & a_i,\bar a_j\in \text{grassman numbers}, A \in\mathbb C\\
\end{align}$$

The gaussian integral of classical anti-commuting fermion fields using grassman algebra resulting in the determinant of the operator, makes it ideal to represent Faddeev-Popov determinant that arises in gauge fixing of fields by introduction of non-physical fermionic degrees of freedom known as Faddeev-Popov ghosts.

Proof

Note that, if we let $r=\sqrt{x^2+y^2}$ be the radius, then we can use the usual polar coordinate change of variables (which in particular renders $dx\,dy=r\,dr\,d\theta$) to get:
$$\left ( \int_{-\infty}^{\infty} e^{-{a \over 2} x^2}\,dx \right )^2 = \left ( \int_{-\infty}^{\infty} e^{-{a \over 2} x^2}\,dx \right ) \cdot \left ( \int_{-\infty}^{\infty} e^{-{a \over 2} y^2}\,dy \right ) = 2\pi \int_{0}^{\infty} r e^{-{a \over 2} r^2}\,dr = {2\pi\over a} \int_{0}^{\infty} e^{- w}\,dw = {2\pi\over a}.$$
The second integral can be performed by completing the square:
$$\left( -{1 \over 2} a x^2 + Jx\right )  = -{1 \over 2} a \left ( x -  { J \over a } \right )^2 + { J^2 \over 2a }=-{1 \over 2} a x'^2 + { J^2 \over 2a }$$
and using the fact that $\int_{-\infty}^{\infty}dx()=\int_{-\infty}^{\infty}dx'()$. This relation is also proportional to the Fourier transform of the Gaussian with the identification $J\rightarrow iJ$, the conjugate variable of x. Rewriting an interacting quantum field theory of linear potential by redefinition of fields in the above manner is also known as the Hubbard–Stratonovich transformation, used to interpret particles interacting through a linear potential as free particles i.e. redefined fields having linear equations of motion.

Since A is a real symmetric matrix, it is diagonalizable by an orthogonal matrix O, i.e., O^{T} = O^{−1}. It is therefore
$$A_{ij} x^i x^j \equiv x^\text{T}Ax = x^\text{T} \left(OO^\text{T}\right) A \left(OO^\text{T}\right)  x = \left(x^\text{T}O \right) \left(O^\text{T}AO \right) \left(O^\text{T}x \right)=y\cdot D\cdot y,$$
where D ≡ O^{T}AO is a diagonal matrix with the eigenvalues λ_{i} of A as elements. With the diagonalization the integral can be written
$$\int \exp\left( - \frac 1 2 x^\text{T} A x \right) d^nx = \int \exp\left( - \frac 1 2 \sum_{j=1}^2 \lambda_{i} y_i^2 \right) \, d^ny= \Pi_i\int \exp\left( - \frac 1 2 \lambda_i y_i^2 \right) \, dy_i.$$
Since the coordinate transformation is simply a rotation of coordinates the Jacobian determinant of the transformation is one yielding $d^2y = d^2x$. Hence results of previous integrals can be used, along with the identification $\Pi_i(\lambda_i)=\det A,\Pi_i(\lambda_i+i\varepsilon)=\det (A+i\varepsilon I).$ Positive definiteness ensures $\lambda_i>0$ condition required for use of the first relation and that the matrix $A$ is invertible. Similarly $A+i\varepsilon$ is ensured to be invertible since its spectrum is necessarily complex, having no null eigenvalues.

=== Integrals with differential operators in the argument ===
As an example consider the integral
$$\int \exp\left[  \int d^4x \left (-\frac{1}{2} \varphi  \hat A  \varphi +  J  \varphi \right) \right ] D\varphi$$
where $\hat A$ is a Hermitian differential operator with positive spectra for convergence, $\varphi$ and J functions of spacetime, and $D\varphi$ indicates integration over all possible paths. In analogy with the matrix version of this integral the solution is
$$\int \exp\left[  \int d^4x \left (-\frac 1 2 \varphi \hat A \varphi +J\varphi \right) \right ] D\varphi \; \propto \; \exp \left( {1\over 2} \int d^4x \; d^4y J(x) D( x - y) J(y) \right)$$
where
$$\hat A D( x - y) = \delta^4 ( x - y)$$
and D(x − y), called the propagator, is the inverse of $\hat A$, and $\delta^4( x - y)$ is the Dirac delta function.

Similar arguments yield for $\hat A$ Hermitian differential operator of any spectra, where the $\varepsilon\rightarrow 0^+$ prescription, called Feynman prescription, is treated separately in the last step of all calculations
$$\int \exp\left[ i \int d^4x \left ( \frac 1 2 \varphi ( \hat A +i\varepsilon) \varphi +  J\varphi \right) \right ] D\varphi \; \propto \; \exp \left( -{ i\over 2} \int d^4x \; d^4y J(x) D_\varepsilon( x - y) J(y) \right).$$

See Path-integral formulation of virtual-particle exchange for an application of this integral.

It is not necessarily the case that the differential operator has appropriate spectral properties, for example, $\hat A=\partial_\mu\partial^\mu$, has null eigenvalues, is non-invertible and hence, its propagator is not uniquely determined. However, addition of a small complex part $i\varepsilon$ removes any null eigenvalues as the spectra is necessarily complex making the operator invertible again. Such cases can also be treated by redefinition of fields and imposing appropriate boundary condition, which is equivalent to the Feynman $i\varepsilon$ prescription, which is also equivalent to analytically continuing to Euclidean theory and continuing back after computations using Wick rotations in a particular direction.

== Integral approximation by the method of steepest descent ==
In quantum field theory n-dimensional integrals of the form
$$\int_{-\infty}^{\infty} \exp\left( -{1 \over \hbar} f(q) \right ) d^nq$$
appear often. Here $\hbar$ is the reduced Planck constant and f is a function with a positive minimum at $q=q_0$. These integrals can be approximated by the method of steepest descent.

For small values of the Planck constant, f can be expanded about its minimum
$$\int_{-\infty}^{\infty} \exp\left[ -{1 \over \hbar} \left( f\left( q_0 \right) + {1\over 2} \left( q-q_0\right)^2 f^{\prime \prime} \left( q-q_0\right) + \cdots \right ) \right] d^nq.$$
Here $f^{\prime \prime}$ is the n by n matrix of second derivatives evaluated at the minimum of the function.

If we neglect higher order terms this integral can be integrated explicitly.
$$\int_{-\infty}^{\infty} \exp\left[ -{1 \over \hbar} (f(q)) \right] d^nq \approx \exp\left[ -{1 \over \hbar} \left( f\left( q_0 \right)   \right ) \right] \sqrt{ (2 \pi \hbar )^n \over \det f^{\prime \prime} }.$$

== Integral approximation by the method of stationary phase ==
A common integral is a path integral of the form
$$\int \exp\left( {i \over \hbar}  S\left( q, \dot q \right) \right ) Dq$$
where $S\left( q, \dot q \right)$ is the classical action and the integral is over all possible paths that a particle may take. In the limit of small $\hbar$ the integral can be evaluated in the stationary phase approximation. In this approximation the integral is over the path in which the action is a minimum. Therefore, this approximation recovers the classical limit of mechanics.

== Fourier integrals ==
=== Dirac delta distribution ===
The Dirac delta distribution in spacetime can be written as a Fourier transform
$$\int \frac{d^4 k}{(2\pi)^4} \exp(ik ( x-y)) = \delta^4 ( x-y).$$
In general, for any dimension $N$
$$\int \frac{d^N k}{(2\pi)^N} \exp(ik ( x-y)) = \delta^N ( x-y).$$

=== Fourier integrals for finding effective potential ===
Identifying two to two elastic scattering results of Quantum field theory with first Born approximation results from quantum mechanics in the relation $M_\text{el.}(p_i\rightarrow p_f)=V(q=p_f-p_i)$ where incoming particle undergo elastic scattering, i.e. $p_i^0=p_f^0$ against a heavy static particle. Thus, the form of potential is found by Fourier transform which is the Fourier inverse of propagator of the virtual exchange particle in the tree level.

==== Laplacian of 1/r ====
While not an integral, the identity in three-dimensional Euclidean space
$$-{1 \over 4\pi} \nabla^2 \left( {1 \over r} \right)  = \delta \left( \mathbf r \right)$$
where $r^2 = \mathbf r \cdot \mathbf r$, is a consequence of Gauss's theorem and can be used to derive integral identities. For an example see Longitudinal and transverse vector fields.

This identity implies that the Fourier integral representation of 1/r is
$$\int \frac{d^3 k}{(2\pi)^3}  { \exp \left ( i\mathbf k \cdot \mathbf r \right) \over k^2  } = {1 \over 4 \pi r }.$$

==== Yukawa potential: the Coulomb potential with mass ====
The Yukawa potential in three dimensions can be represented as an integral over a Fourier transform
$$\int \frac{d^3 k}{(2\pi)^3} { \exp \left ( i\mathbf k \cdot \mathbf r \right) \over k^2 +m^2 } = {e^{-mr} \over 4 \pi r }$$
where $r^2 = \mathbf{r} \cdot \mathbf r, \,k^2 = \mathbf k \cdot \mathbf k$.

See Static forces and virtual-particle exchange for an application of this integral. In the small m limit the integral reduces to 1/4πr.

Proof

To derive this result note:
$$\begin{align}
\int \frac{d^3 k}{(2\pi)^3} \frac{\exp \left (i \mathbf k \cdot \mathbf r\right)}{k^2 +m^2}
={}& \int_0^{\infty} \frac{k^2 dk}{(2\pi)^2} \int_{-1}^1 du {e^{ikru}\over k^2 + m^2} \\[1ex]
={}& {2\over r} \int_0^{\infty} \frac{k dk}{(2\pi)^2} {\sin(kr) \over k^2 + m^2} \\[1ex]
={}& {1\over ir} \int_{-\infty}^{\infty} \frac{k dk}{(2\pi)^2} {e^{ikr} \over k^2 + m^2} \\[1ex]
={}& {1\over ir} \int_{-\infty}^{\infty} \frac{k dk}{(2\pi)^2} {e^{ikr} \over (k + i m)(k - i m)} \\[1ex]
={}& {1\over ir} \frac{2\pi i}{(2\pi)^2} \frac{im}{2im} e^{-mr} \\[1ex]
={}& \frac{1}{4 \pi r} e^{-mr}
\end{align}$$

==== Modified Coulomb potential with mass ====
$$\int \frac{d^3 k}{(2\pi)^3} \left(\mathbf{\hat{k}}\cdot \mathbf{\hat{r}}\right)^2 \frac{\exp \left (i\mathbf{k} \cdot \mathbf{r} \right)}{k^2 +m^2} = \frac{e^{-mr}}{4 \pi r} \left[1 + \frac{2}{mr} - \frac{2}{(mr)^2} \left(e^{mr}-1 \right) \right]$$
where the hat indicates a unit vector in three dimensional space.

Note that in the small m limit the integral goes to the result for the Coulomb potential since the term in the brackets goes to 1.

Proof

The derivation of this result is as follows:
$$\begin{align}
&\int \frac{d^3 k}{(2\pi)^3} \left(\mathbf{\hat k}\cdot \mathbf{\hat r}\right)^2 \frac{\exp \left (i\mathbf{k}\cdot \mathbf{r}\right )}{k^2 +m^2} \\[1ex]
&= \int_0^{\infty} \frac{k^2 dk}{(2\pi)^2} \int_{-1}^{1} du \ u^2 \frac{e^{ikru}}{k^2 + m^2} \\[1ex]
&= 2 \int_0^{\infty} \frac{k^2 dk}{(2\pi)^2} \frac{1}{k^2 + m^2} \left[\frac{1}{kr} \sin(kr) + \frac{2}{(kr)^2} \cos(kr)- \frac{2}{(kr)^3} \sin(kr) \right] \\[1ex]
&= \frac{e^{-mr}}{4\pi r} \left[1 + \frac{2}{mr} - \frac{2}{(mr)^2} \left(e^{mr}-1 \right) \right]
\end{align}$$

==== Longitudinal potential with mass ====
$$\int \frac{d^3 k}{(2\pi)^3} \mathbf{\hat{k}} \mathbf{\hat{k}} \frac{\exp \left ( i\mathbf{k} \cdot \mathbf{r} \right )}{k^2 +m^2 } = {1\over 2} \frac{e^{-mr}}{4\pi r} \left (\left[ \mathbf{1}- \mathbf{\hat{r}} \mathbf{\hat{r}} \right] + \left\{1 + \frac{2}{mr} - {2 \over (mr)^2} \left(e^{mr} -1 \right) \right \} \left[\mathbf{1}+ \mathbf{\hat{r}} \mathbf{\hat{r}}\right] \right )$$
where the hat indicates a unit vector in three dimensional space. Note that in the small m limit the integral reduces to
$${1\over 2} {1 \over 4 \pi r } \left[ \mathbf 1 - \mathbf{\hat r} \mathbf{\hat r} \right].$$

Proof

The derivation for this result is as follows:
$$\begin{align}
& \int \frac{d^3 k}{(2\pi)^3} \mathbf{\hat k} \mathbf{\hat k} \frac{\exp \left (i\mathbf k \cdot \mathbf r \right)}{k^2 +m^2} \\[1ex]
&= \int \frac{d^3 k}{(2\pi)^3} \left[ \left( \mathbf{\hat k}\cdot \mathbf{\hat r}\right)^2\mathbf{\hat r} \mathbf{\hat r} + \left( \mathbf{\hat k}\cdot \mathbf{\hat \theta}\right)^2\mathbf{\hat \theta} \mathbf{\hat \theta} + \left( \mathbf{\hat k}\cdot \mathbf{\hat \phi}\right)^2\mathbf{\hat \phi} \mathbf{\hat \phi} \right] \frac{\exp \left (i\mathbf k \cdot \mathbf r \right )}{k^2 +m^2 } \\[1ex]
&= \frac{e^{-mr}}{4 \pi r}\left\{ 1+ \frac{2}{mr}- {2\over (mr)^2 } \left( e^{mr} -1 \right) \right \} \left\{\mathbf 1  - {1\over 2} \left[\mathbf 1 - \mathbf{\hat r} \mathbf{\hat r}\right] \right\} + \int_0^{\infty} \frac{k^2 dk}{(2\pi)^2 } \int_{-1}^{1} du \frac{e^{ikru}}{k^2 + m^2} {1\over 2}  \left[ \mathbf 1  - \mathbf{\hat r} \mathbf{\hat r} \right] \\[1ex]
&= {1\over 2} \frac{e^{-mr}}{4 \pi r} \left[ \mathbf 1 - \mathbf{\hat r} \mathbf{\hat r} \right]+ {e^{-mr} \over 4 \pi r }  \left\{ 1+\frac{2}{mr} - {2\over (mr)^2} \left( e^{mr} -1 \right) \right \} \left\{ {1\over 2} \left[\mathbf 1 + \mathbf{\hat r} \mathbf{\hat r}\right] \right\} \\[1ex]
&= {1\over 2} \frac{e^{-mr}}{4\pi r} \left (\left[ \mathbf{1}- \mathbf{\hat{r}} \mathbf{\hat{r}} \right] + \left\{1 + \frac{2}{mr} - {2 \over (mr)^2} \left(e^{mr} -1 \right) \right \} \left[\mathbf{1}+ \mathbf{\hat{r}} \mathbf{\hat{r}}\right] \right )
\end{align}$$

==== Transverse potential with mass ====
$$\int \frac{d^3 k}{(2\pi)^3} \left[\mathbf{1} - \mathbf{\hat{k}} \mathbf{\hat{k}} \right] { \exp \left ( i \mathbf{k} \cdot \mathbf{r}\right ) \over k^2 +m^2 } =  {1\over 2} {e^{-mr} \over 4 \pi r} \left\{ {2 \over (mr)^2  } \left( e^{mr} -1 \right) -  {2\over mr} \right \} \left[\mathbf{1} + \mathbf{\hat{r}} \mathbf{\hat{r}}\right]$$

In the small mr limit the integral goes to
$${1\over 2} {1 \over 4 \pi r } \left[\mathbf 1 + \mathbf{\hat r} \mathbf{\hat r}\right].$$
For large distance, the integral falls off as the inverse cube of r
$$\frac{1}{4 \pi m^2r^3 }\left[\mathbf 1 + \mathbf{\hat r} \mathbf{\hat r}\right].$$
For applications of this integral see Darwin Lagrangian and Darwin interaction in a vacuum.

==== Angular integration in cylindrical coordinates ====
There are two important integrals. The angular integration of an exponential in cylindrical coordinates can be written in terms of Bessel functions of the first kind
$$\int_0^{2 \pi} {d\varphi \over 2 \pi} \exp\left( i p \cos( \varphi) \right)=J_0 (p)$$
and
$$\int_0^{2 \pi} {d\varphi \over 2 \pi} \cos( \varphi) \exp\left( i p \cos( \varphi) \right) = i J_1 (p).$$

For applications of these integrals see Magnetic interaction between current loops in a simple plasma or electron gas.

== Integrals used in loop evaluation ==
The following is a useful redefinition used in calculations:

$\frac{1}{a_{0}a_{1}a_{2}\cdots a_{n}}=\Gamma(n+1)\int_{0}^{1}{d}z_{1}\int_{0}^{z_{1}}{d}z_{2}\cdots\int_{0}^{z_{n-1}}{d}z_{n}\frac{1}{[a_{0}+(a_{1}-a_{0})z_{1}+\cdots(a_{n}-a_{n-1})z_{n}]^{n+1}}$

where increasing powers in the denominator is possible $\frac1 {a\cdots}\rightarrow\frac1 {a^k\cdots}$ by operating $\frac{1}{(k-1)!} \left(-\frac{\partial}{\partial a}\right)^{k-1}$ on either side.

$$\frac{1}{A_{1}^{\alpha_{1}}\cdots A_{n}^{\alpha_{n}}} = \frac{\Gamma(\alpha_{1}+\dots+\alpha_{n})}{\Gamma(\alpha_{1})\cdots\Gamma(\alpha_{n})}\int_{0}^{1}d^n x_{1}\frac{\delta(1-\sum_{k=1}^{n}x_{k})\;x_{1}^{\alpha_{1}-1}\cdots x_{n}^{\alpha_{n}-1}}{\left(\sum_{k=1}^{n}x_{k}A_{k}\right)^{\sum_{k=1}^{n}\alpha_{k}}}$$

This is referred to as Feynman Parametrization.

The following integrals are commonly used results in the calculation of loop integrals in cutoff regularization, where Minkowski dot product is used between vectors and $\lim_{\epsilon\rightarrow 0^+}$ is evaluated:
$$\begin{align}
\int{d}^{4}k\frac{1}{\left(k^2-s+i\varepsilon\right)^n}&=i\pi^{2}(-1)^n\frac{\Gamma(n-2)}{\Gamma(n)}\frac{1}{s^{n-2}},& n\geq 3,\\
\int{d}^{4}k\frac{k^{\mu}}{\left(k^{2}-s+i\varepsilon\right)^{n}}&=0,&n\geq3,\\
\int{d}^{4}k\frac{k^{\mu}k^{\nu}}{(k^{2}-s+{i}\varepsilon)^{n}}&={i}\pi^{2}(-1)^{n+1}\frac{\Gamma(n-3)}{2\Gamma(n)}\frac{g^{\mu\nu}}{s^{n-3}},& n\geq 4,\\
\int{d}^{4}p\frac{1}{(p^{2}+2pq+t+{i}\varepsilon)^{n}}&={i}\pi^{2}\frac{\Gamma(n-2)}{\Gamma(n)}\frac{1}{(t-q^{2})^{n-2}},& n\geq 3,\\
\int{d}^{4}p\frac{p^{\mu}}{(p^{2}+2pq+t+{i}\varepsilon)^{n}}&=-{i}\pi^{2}\frac{\Gamma(n-2)}{\Gamma(n)}\frac{q^{\mu}}{(t-q^{2})^{n-2}},& n\geq 3,\\
\int{d}^{4}p\frac{p^{\mu}p^{\nu}}{(p^{2}+2pq+t+{i}\varepsilon)^{n}}&={i}\pi^{2}\frac{\Gamma(n-3)}{2\Gamma(n)}\frac{[2(n-3)q^{\mu}q^{\nu}+(t-q^{2})g^{\mu\nu}]}{(t-q^{2})^{n-2}},& n\geq 4.
\end{align}$$

A similar set of relations are used in dimensional regularization as follows, where $n>D/2$ and $\lim_{\epsilon\rightarrow 0^+}$ is evaluated:
$$\begin{align}
\int\frac{{d}^{D}k}{\left(k^{2}-s+{i}\varepsilon\right)^{n}}&={i}\pi^{D/2}(-1)^{n}\frac{\Gamma(n-D/2)}{\Gamma(n)}\frac{1}{s^{n-D/2}},\\
\int{d}^{D}k\frac{k^{\mu}}{\left(k^{2}-s+{i}\varepsilon\right)^{n}}&=0,\\
\int{d}^{D}k\frac{k^{\mu}k^{\nu}}{\left(k^{2}-s+{i}\varepsilon\right)^{n}}&={i}\pi^{D/2}(-1)^{n+1}\frac{\Gamma(n-D/2-1)}{2\Gamma(n)}\frac{g^{\mu\nu}}{s^{n-D/2-1}},\\
\int{d}^{D}k\frac{k^{2}}{\left(k^{2}-s+{i}\varepsilon\right)^{n}}&={i}\pi^{D/2}(-1)^{n+1}\frac{\Gamma(n-D/2-1)}{2\Gamma(n)}\frac{D}{s^{n-D/2-1}},\\
\int{d}^{D}k\frac{(k^{2})^2}{\left(k^{2}-s+{i}\varepsilon\right)^{n}}&={i}\pi^{D/2}(-1)^{n}\frac{\Gamma(n-D/2-1)}{4\Gamma(n)}\frac{D(D+2)}{s^{n-D/2-1}},\\
\int{d}^{D}k\frac{k^\mu k^\nu k^\rho k^\sigma}{\left(k^{2}-s+{i}\varepsilon\right)^{n}}&={i}\pi^{D/2}(-1)^{n}\frac{\Gamma(n-D/2-1)}{4\Gamma(n)}\frac{[g^{\mu\nu}g^{\rho\sigma}+g^{\mu\rho}g^{\nu\sigma}+g^{\mu\sigma}g^{\nu\rho}]}{s^{n-D/2-1}}.
\end{align}$$

== Bessel functions ==
=== Integration of the cylindrical propagator with mass ===
==== First power of a Bessel function ====
$$\int_0^{\infty} {k\; dk \over k^2 +m^2} J_0 \left( kr \right)=K_0 (mr).$$

See Abramowitz and Stegun.

For $mr \ll 1$, we have
$$K_0 (mr) \to -\ln \left( {mr \over 2}\right) + 0.5772.$$

For an application of this integral see Two line charges embedded in a plasma or electron gas.

==== Squares of Bessel functions ====
The integration of the propagator in cylindrical coordinates is
$$\int_0^{\infty} {k\; dk \over k^2 +m^2} J_1^2 (kr) =I_1 (mr)K_1 (mr).$$

For small mr the integral becomes
$$\int_o^{\infty} {k\; dk \over k^2 +m^2} J_1^2 (kr) \to {1\over 2 }\left[ 1 - {1\over 8} (mr)^2 \right].$$

For large mr the integral becomes
$$\int_o^{\infty} {k\; dk \over k^2 +m^2} J_1^2 (kr) \to {1\over 2} \left( {1\over mr}\right).$$

For applications of this integral see Magnetic interaction between current loops in a simple plasma or electron gas.

In general,
$$\int_0^{\infty} {k\; dk \over k^2 +m^2} J_{\nu}^2 (kr) = I_{\nu} (mr)K_{\nu} (mr) \qquad \Re (\nu) > -1.$$

=== Integration over a magnetic wave function ===
The two-dimensional integral over a magnetic wave function is
$${2 a^{2n+2}\over n!} \int_0^{\infty} { dr }\;r^{2n+1}\exp\left( -a^2 r^2\right) J_{0} (kr) = M\left( n+1, 1, -{k^2 \over 4a^2}\right).$$

Here, M is a confluent hypergeometric function. For an application of this integral see Charge density spread over a wave function.

== See also ==
- Relation between Schrödinger's equation and the path integral formulation of quantum mechanics
- Grassmann number
