= Quantum oscillations =

Experiments used to map the Fermi surface

In condensed matter physics, quantum oscillations describes a series of related experimental techniques used to map the Fermi surface of a metal in the presence of a strong magnetic field. These techniques are based on the principle of Landau quantization of Fermions moving in a magnetic field. For a gas of free fermions in a strong magnetic field, the energy levels are quantized into bands, called the Landau levels, whose separation is proportional to the strength of the magnetic field. In a quantum oscillation experiment, the external magnetic field is varied, which causes the Landau levels to pass over the Fermi surface, which in turn results in oscillations of the electronic density of states at the Fermi level; this produces oscillations in the many material properties which depend on this, including resistance (the Shubnikov–de Haas effect), Hall resistance, and magnetic susceptibility (the de Haas–van Alphen effect). Observation of quantum oscillations in a material is considered a signature of Fermi liquid behaviour.

Quantum oscillations have been used to study high temperature superconducting materials such as cuprates and pnictides. Studies using these experiments have shown that the ground state of underdoped cuprates behave similar to a Fermi liquid, and display characteristics such as Landau quasiparticles.

In 2021 this technique has been used to observe a predicted state called "electron–phonon fluid", a similar particle-quasiparticle state already known is the exciton–polariton fluid.

== Experiment ==
When a magnetic field is applied to a system of free charged fermions, their energy states are quantized into the so-called Landau levels, given by

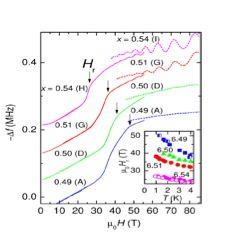
YBCO superconductor under high magnetic field. As field strength is increased, superconductivity is suppressed and Landau oscillations can be observed

$\varepsilon_l=\frac{eB}{m^*}\left(\ell +\frac{1}{2}\right)$

for integer-valued $\ell$, where $B$ is the external magnetic field and $e,m^*$ are the fermion charge and effective mass respectively.

When the external magnetic field $B$ is increased in an isolated system, the Landau levels expand, and eventually "fall off" the Fermi surface. This leads to oscillations in the observed energy of the highest occupied level, and hence in many physical properties (including Hall conductivity, resistivity, and susceptibility). The periodicity of these oscillations can be measured, and in turn can be used to determine the cross-sectional area of the Fermi surface. If the axis of the magnetic field is varied at constant magnitude, similar oscillations are observed. The oscillations occur whenever the Landau orbits touch the Fermi surface. In this way, the complete geometry of the Fermi sphere can be mapped.

== Underdoped cuprates ==
Studies of underdoped cuprate compounds such as YBa_{2}Cu_{3}O_{6+x} through probes such as ARPES have indicated that these phases show characteristics of non-Fermi liquids, and in particular, the absence of well-defined Landau quasiparticles. However, quantum oscillations have been observed in these materials at low temperatures, if their superconductivity is suppressed by a sufficiently high magnetic field, which is evidence for the presence of well-defined quasiparticles with fermionic statistics. These experimental results thus disagree with those from ARPES and other probes.

== See also ==
- de Haas–van Alphen effect
- Shubnikov–de Haas effect
- Landau levels
