= Cyclotron motion =

Motion of charged particles

Diagram of a cyclotron orbit of a particle with speed v, which is the classical trajectory of a charged particle (here positive charge) under a uniform magnetic field B.

In physics, cyclotron motion, also known as gyromotion, refers to the circular motion exhibited by charged particles in a uniform magnetic field.

The circular trajectory of a particle in cyclotron motion is characterized by an angular frequency referred to as the cyclotron frequency or gyrofrequency and a radius referred to as the cyclotron radius, gyroradius, or Larmor radius. For a particle with charge $q$ and mass $m$ initially moving with speed $v_\perp$ perpendicular to the direction of a uniform magnetic field $B$, the cyclotron radius is:
$$r_{\rm c} = \frac{m v_{\perp}}{|q| B}$$
and the cyclotron frequency is:
$$\omega_{\rm c} = \frac{|q|B}{m}.$$
An external oscillating field matching the cyclotron frequency, $\omega=\omega_c,$ will accelerate the particles, a phenomenon known as cyclotron resonance. This resonance is the basis for many scientific and engineering uses of cyclotron motion.

In quantum mechanical systems, the energies of cyclotron orbits are quantized into discrete Landau levels, which contribute to Landau diamagnetism and lead to oscillatory electronic phenomena like the De Haas–Van Alphen and Shubnikov–de Haas effects. They are also responsible for the exact quantization of Hall resistance in the integer quantum Hall effect.

== Parameters ==
=== Cyclotron frequency ===
If a particle with electric charge $q$ and mass $m$ is moving with velocity $\vec{v}$ in a uniform magnetic field $\vec{B}$, then it will experience a Lorentz force given by
$$\vec{F} = q(\vec{v} \times \vec{B}).$$
The direction of the force is given by the cross product of the velocity and magnetic field. Thus, the Lorentz force will always act perpendicular to the direction of motion, causing the particle to gyrate, or move in a circle. The radius of this circle, $r_{\rm c}$, can be determined for non-relativistic particles by equating the magnitude of the Lorentz force to the centripetal force as
$$\frac{m v_{\perp}^2}{r_{\rm c}} = |q| v_{\perp} B.$$
Rearranging, the cyclotron radius can be expressed as
$$r_{\rm c} = \frac{m v_{\perp}}{|q| B}.$$
Thus, the cyclotron radius is directly proportional to the particle mass and perpendicular velocity, while it is inversely proportional to the particle electric charge and the magnetic field strength. The time it takes the particle to complete one revolution, called the period, can be calculated to be
$$T_{\rm c} = \frac{2 \pi r_{\rm c}}{v_{\perp}}.$$
The period is the reciprocal of the cyclotron frequency:
$$f_{\rm c} = \frac{1}{T_{\rm c}} = \frac{|q| B}{2 \pi m}$$
or
$$\omega_{\rm c} = \frac{|q| B}{m}.$$
The cyclotron frequency is independent of the radius and velocity and therefore independent of the particle's kinetic energy; in the non-relativistic limit all particles with the same charge-to-mass ratio rotate around magnetic field lines with the same frequency.

The cyclotron frequency is also useful in non-uniform magnetic fields, in which (assuming slow variation of magnitude of the magnetic field) the movement is approximately helical. That is, in the direction parallel to the magnetic field, the motion is uniform, whereas in the plane perpendicular to the magnetic field the movement is circular. The sum of these two motions gives a trajectory in the shape of a helix.

=== Cyclotron resonance ===
An oscillating field matching the cyclotron frequency of particles creates a cyclotron resonance. For ions in a uniform magnetic field in a vacuum chamber, an oscillating electric field at the cyclotron resonance frequency creates a particle accelerator called a cyclotron. An oscillating radiofrequency field matching the cyclotron frequency is used to heat plasma.

=== Gaussian units ===
The above is for SI units. In some cases, the cyclotron frequency is given in Gaussian units. In Gaussian units, the Lorentz force differs by a factor of 1/c, the speed of light, which leads to:

$$\omega_{\rm c} = \frac{v}{r} = \frac{qB}{mc}$$.

For materials with little or no magnetism (i.e. $\mu \approx 1$) $H \approx B$, so we can use the easily measured magnetic field intensity H instead of B:

$$\omega_{\rm c} = \frac{qH}{mc}$$.

Note that converting this expression to SI units introduces a factor of the vacuum permeability.

=== Effective mass ===
For some materials, the motion of electrons follows loops that depend on the applied magnetic field, but not exactly the same way. For these materials, we define a cyclotron effective mass, $m^*$ so that:

$$\omega_{\rm c} = \frac{qB}{m^*}$$.

== Relativistic case ==
For relativistic particles the classical equation needs to be interpreted in terms of particle momentum $p=\gamma m v$:
$$r_{\rm c} = \frac{p_{\perp}}{{|q| B}} = \frac{\gamma m v_{\perp}}{|q| B}$$
where $\gamma$ is the Lorentz factor. This equation is correct also in the non-relativistic case.

For calculations in accelerator and astroparticle physics, the formula for the cyclotron radius can be rearranged to give
$$r_{\rm c} = \mathrm{3.3~m} \times \frac{( \gamma m c^2 / \mathrm{GeV}) \cdot (v_{\perp}/c)}{(|q|/e) \cdot (B/\mathrm{T})},$$
where m denotes metres, c is the speed of light, GeV is the unit of Giga-electronVolts, $e$ is the elementary charge, and T is the unit of tesla.

== Quantization ==
In quantum mechanics, the energies of cyclotron orbits of charged particles in a uniform magnetic field are quantized to discrete values, known as Landau levels after the Soviet physicist Lev Landau. These levels are degenerate, with the number of electrons per level directly proportional to the strength of the applied magnetic field.

Landau quantization contributes towards magnetic susceptibility of metals, known as Landau diamagnetism. Under strong magnetic fields, Landau quantization leads to oscillations in electronic properties of materials as a function of the applied magnetic field known as the De Haas–Van Alphen and Shubnikov–de Haas effects.

Landau quantization is a key ingredient in explanation of the integer quantum Hall effect.

== See also ==
- Ion cyclotron resonance
- Electron cyclotron resonance
- Beam rigidity
- Cyclotron
- Magnetosphere particle motion
- Gyrokinetics
