= Two temperature model =

Statistical mechanics model for ultrafast carrier relaxation

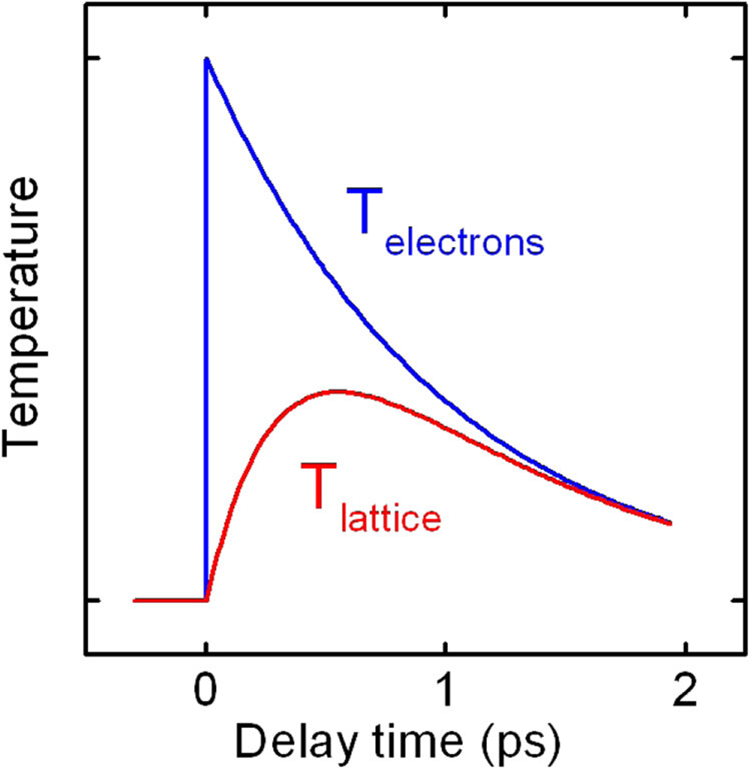
An illustration of the two-temperature model showing the electron temperature and lattice temperature immediately following laser excitation of a metal.

In statistical mechanics, the two-temperature model (TTM) is a mathematical model that describes how materials respond to intense electric currents or ultrashort optical pulses, such as those produced by ultrafast lasers. It describes a transient partial equilibrium state between electronic and phononic populations within the material. In the context of material science and solid state physics, this model is used to describe the process of ultrafast carrier relaxation following excitation. Such dynamics is so fast that, in order to probe it, it is necessary to set up experiments that use ultrafast lasers as the sources of excitation. This kind of experiments (and related simulations) fall under the subjects of ultrafast spectroscopy and ultrafast laser physics.

The two-temperature model was first introduced by Moisey Isaakovich Kaganov and colleagues in 1957. Then, in 1974 it was extended to the case of metals exposed to ultrashort laser pulses. Although originally developed for metals, it also applies to semiconductors. Nowadays, the TTM is used in the context of ultrafast spectroscopy, ultrafast laser ablation and can be applied (with additional constraints) to micro and nano systems. It can also be used to study widespread technologies, such as electronic circuits, where the passage of an electric current in the metallic conductor can create a state of non-equilibrium between electrons and phonons.

Experimental evidence supports this model. Also, its application for the description of emerging systems such as low dimensional ones has been a subject of investigation.

== Overview ==
In a TTM, an energy balance is computed, generally assuming that, apart from the energy coming from the laser impulse, the thermodynamic system (the sample under study) is otherwise closed. Being a closed system, in this context, means that the energy transfer to the surrounding environment is neglected. The model postulates that two subsystems exist, namely the electronic population and the lattice (phonons), and that they are free to exchange energy and allowed to have different temperatures. These two temperatures typically evolve over time, due to the out-of-equilibrium condition generated by the absorption of energy from an ultrashort pulse. After excitation, while the electronic temperature rises almost instantaneously, the lattice remains relatively "cold". This happens because the electronic heat capacity is assumed to be very low compared to that of the lattice. The gap between the two temperatures depends on the laser fluence and can range from hundreds to thousands of kelvin.

For describing the time evolution of the two systems, two coupled differential equations can be set up. These equations model the energy transfer between the two systems by means an electron-phonon coupling parameter, which is related to the rate of energy exchange (electron-phonon scattering rate). The two-temperature model can be thus used to represent the cooling process of hot electrons. However, it does not take into account the initial process of internal thermalization of non-thermal electrons, considering that this phenomenon occurs on timescales that are much faster than those of hot electron cooling (electron-phonon energy exchange). Nonetheless, it must be considered that, in real systems, the processes of electronic internal thermalization and hot electron cooling are not always happening in a sequential order, but rather they overlap in time. Therefore, data analysis is required in order to disentangle different time-constants that characterize each material or sample.

=== Common ambiguities ===
As pointed out by C. Bauer, J.-P. Abid and H. Girault, when describing the two-temperature model, the processes involved can be called in several ways, so, different authors choose different names for them. This may lead to confusion or just make comparison between models less straightforward. Thus, it is useful to list the names and phrases that describe essentially the same process and that are used as synonyms in literature. On one hand, the expression "internal thermalization" (of non-thermal electrons) can be substituted by:

- electron–electron scattering
- build-up of Fermi–Dirac electron distribution
- hot electron thermalization
- formation of a hot electron gas
- establishment of an electronic temperature.

On the other hand, the expression "external thermalization" is equivalent to:

- hot electron cooling
- nonequilibrium energy-loss process
- electron–phonon interaction process.

== History of the model ==
=== Origins ===
The two-temperature model was introduced by Mosey I. Kaganov, Ilya Lifschitz and L. V. Tanatarov in their paper published in 1957. In this paper, they considered the behaviour of a metal in the presence of a large electric current, specifically in the case when the mean energy of the electrons inside the metal differs appreciably from that of the lattice. In these conditions, as was shown by a previous paper by E. S. Borovik and colleagues, deviations from Ohm's law in metals can be observed. To explain this situation, Kaganov and colleagues considered a state of (transient) "partial equilibrium", where, on one hand, the electron gas is in a state of equilibrium and can be described by a Fermi–Dirac distribution, but, on the other hand, the equilibrium between the electron gas and the lattice is still far from being achieved. They also presented a way to calculate the electron-lattice heat transfer coefficient for arbitrary temperatures. It must be noticed that a previous work by Vitaly Ginzburg and V. P. Shabanskii had already tackled this problem at high temperatures (above the Debye temperature). Kaganov and colleagues computed the amount of energy (per unit volume) transferred from the electrons to the lattice in unit time and explored the case where the temperature difference between electrons and lattice is much less than the lattice temperature. In their model, they ignored the electronic band structure of the metal.

In 1974, the work done by Kaganov and colleagues was further extended to the case of a metal exposed to ultra-short laser pulses by S. I. Anisimov, B. L. Kapeliovich and T. L. Perel'man, who were interested in the study of thermionic emission in metals under picosecond pulse illumination.

In 1984, J. G. Fujimoto, J. M. Liu, E. P. Ippen and N. Bloembergen reported the observation of multiphoton and thermally-assisted photoemission from a tungsten metal surface after excitation with 75-fs optical pulses. They provided experimental evidence of a thermal nonequilibrium between the electrons and the lattice. Also, time-resolved pump-probe measurements indicated an electron-phonon energy relaxation time of several hundred femtoseconds. This experimental data motivated the work published in 1987 by Allen, in which he theoretically revisited the energy relaxation dynamics through electron–phonon scattering.

== Mathematical formulation ==
=== Assumptions ===
The following are the basic assumptions of the two-temperature model:

- The thermodynamic system is at room temperature (around 300 K) before the pulse arrives.
- The electronic heat capacity is much smaller than the phononic heat capacity: $C_e\ll C_p$, at room temperature. Thus, the ultrafast pulse creates a non-equilibrium (also called non-thermal) electronic distribution, but leaves the lattice temperature almost unchanged (around 300 K). The electrons (considered as a closed sub-system) then redistribute their energy through electron-electron scattering events. This takes a time of some thousands of femtoseconds, after which the electronic population settles at a high-temperature equilibrium Fermi-Dirac distribution. This can be called an excited thermalised electron gas.
- The excited thermalised electron gas then transfers energy to the phonon sub-system via electron-phonon scattering events.
- Electron-electron scattering (coulombic interaction) and phonon-phonon (anharmonic) scattering are much faster than electron-phonon scattering. So, the temperature $T_e$ of electrons and the temperature $T$ of phonons are well-defined, and, for a certain time, two equilibrium distributions exist:

(for electrons) $N_k=\frac{1}{e^{\beta_e(\varepsilon-\varepsilon_0)}+1}$, $\beta_e=\frac{1}{k_BT_e}$
(for phonons) $N_f=\frac{1}{e^{\beta\hbar\omega_f}-1}$, $\beta=\frac{1}{k_BT}$
where $N_k$ is the Fermi-Dirac distribution of electrons, while $N_f$ is the Bose-Einstein distribution of phonons.

- It's possible to neglect acceleration of electrons due to external or internal fields.
- No other collision process is relevant.
- The excitation occurs homogeneously throughout the material's volume and spatial diffusion can be neglected. Thus, the only important term in the Boltzmann transport equation is the collision term, which accounts for the scattering events between particles. Specifically, the collision term represents either absorption or emission of a phonon during inelastic electron-phonon scattering. This is a good approximation when the electron mean free path is short.
- The ultrafast pulse is short, so it can be represented by a Dirac delta distribution.

Following the derivations reported in the papers by Kaganov and Singh, these assumptions can be implemented inside the constituent equations of the two-temperature model, which are the following two differential equations:

$\frac{\partial(C_e T_e)}{\partial t} =-G(T_e-T)$

$\frac{\partial(C_p T)}{\partial t} =+G(T_e-T)$

If the source of excitation (i.e. the laser pulse) cannot simply be modeled by a Dirac delta because it evolves in time, a term $Q(t)$ can be added to the first equation, indicating the laser power density absorbed by the electronic sub-system. Thus, the first equation becomes:

$\frac{\partial(C_e T_e)}{\partial t} =-G(T_e-T)+Q(t)$

=== Temperature dependence of the external thermalization timescale ===
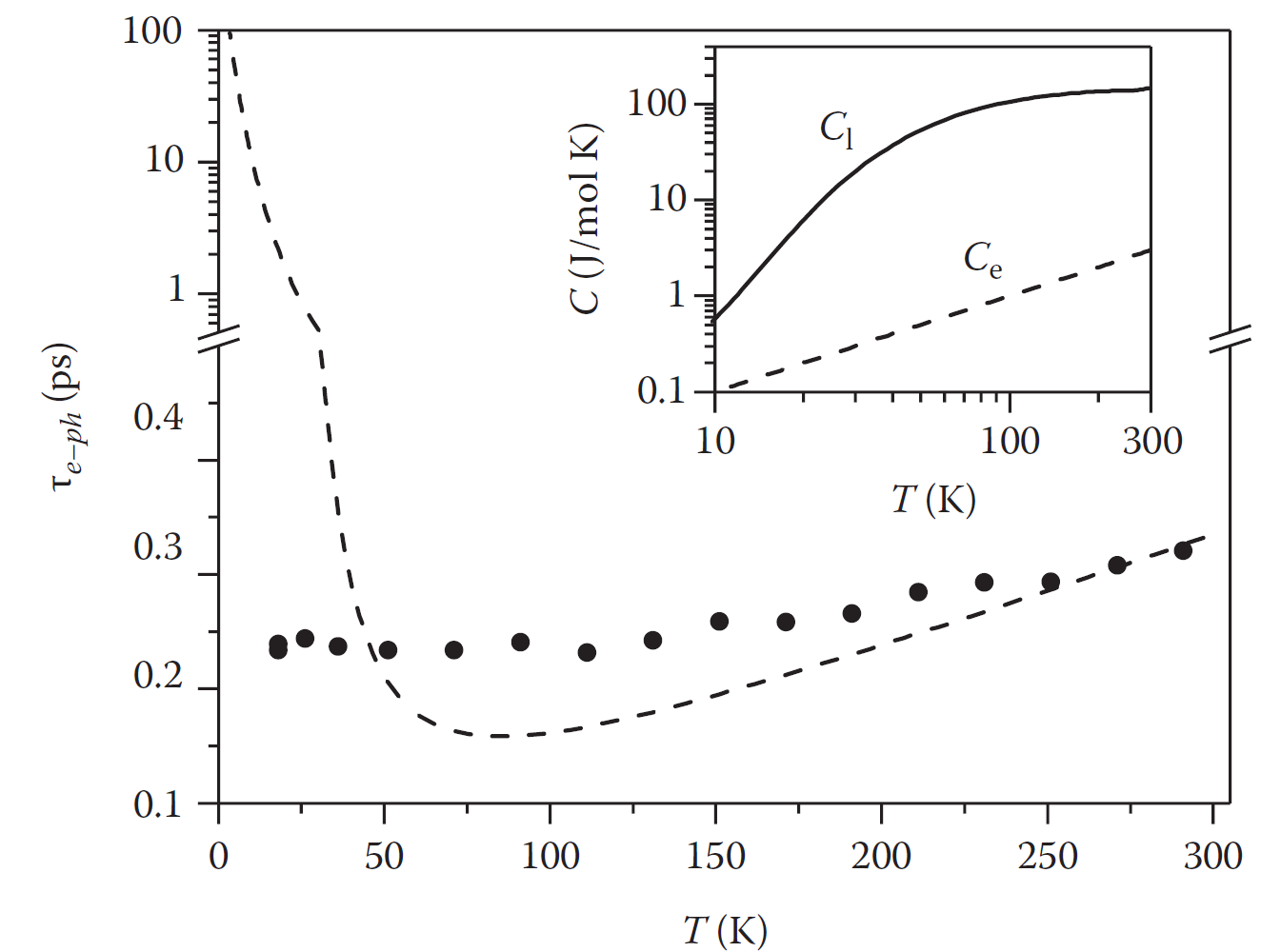
The expected T-dependence of the external thermalization time in the two-temperature model in the weak perturbation regime compared to experimental data on metallic $\ce{LuAgCu4}$. The inset shows the T-dependence of the electronic and lattice specific heat. As can be seen at high temperatures, there is a qualitative agreement with the model (the relaxation time increases with temperature); however, no upturn in $\tau_{e-ph}$ is observed at low temperatures. The figure was originally from the paper by J. Demsar and colleagues, and was adapted by R. Prasankumar and colleagues.

There are special limit cases where the temperature-dependence of the time of external thermalization can be calculated from the two-temperature model and turns out to be very simple. For example, in the low excitation regime, where the electronic temperature is only slightly increased after excitation, we have the following:

$\tau_{e-ph}\propto T^{-3}$ at $T\leq \frac{T_D}{5}$

$\tau_{e-ph}\propto T$ at $T \geq T_D$

where $T_D$ is the Debye temperature. This is an example of predictions of the two-temperature model in specific ranges of temperature. At high temperatures (at least comparable to $T_D$), experiments on metals show a qualitative agreement with this prediction. However, there is generally no agreement at low temperatures: this failure of the two-temperature model can be attributed to the fact that, at low temperature, the assumption that internal thermalization occurs much faster than external thermalization doesn't hold anymore. This point will be further analysed in the next paragraphs.

For a complete discussion on how the external thermalization timescale changes with temperature, see section 8.2.3 of the book curated by R. P. Prasankumar and A. J. Taylor.

=== Computational methods ===
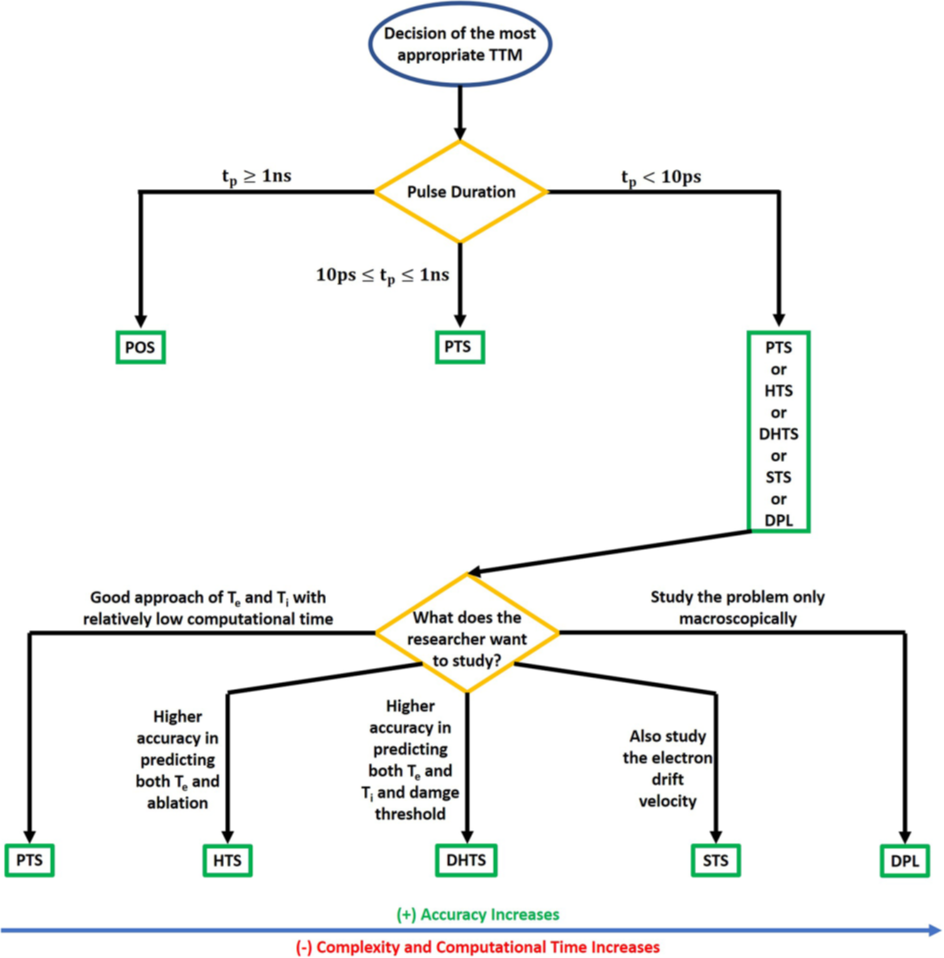
Concept map for the selection of the most appropriate two-temperature model.

In their extensive review of two-temperature models, V. E. Alexopoulou and A. P. Markopoulos present several versions of the model and list many computational methods that can be adopted to solve the two-temperature model equations numerically. Moreover, they provide a concept map designed in order to help other researchers to choose the most appropriate two-temperature model, based on the parameters of their problem and the target of their study.

== Applications to metal nanosystems ==
Systems at the nanoscale generally behave differently with respect to the bulk. This is due to the high relevance assumed by surface effects: surface interactions and the role of interfacial phenomena become prominent with respect to bulk effects. To adapt the two-temperature model to this situation, it is therefore necessary to modify it. For instance, it may be required to introduce extra geometric constraints on the equations.

=== Nanoscale metal films ===
As discussed by N. Singh, the two-temperature model can be adapted to thin films whose thickness is comparable to the electron mean free path in the material. In the case of metal films, surface phonons become prevalent in the interaction with electrons. Thus, it can be found that the energy transfer rate from thermalized hot electrons to surface phonons is much smaller than the energy transfer to the bulk phonons. It must also be underlined that the coupling between the film and the substrate on which it has been grown may be very important: it can imply a strong damping of the surface phonon modes. In the paper by Singh, a complete derivation of the behaviour of photoexcited thin films can be found.

It is also possible to apply the two-temperature model to nanostructured metal films. An example is given by the work done by Bresson and colleagues (published in 2020) on gold nanorod arrays: they integrated thermal conduction and the three-dimensional finite element method model in their two-temperature model, and found agreement between numerical simulations and experimental data.

=== Metal nanoparticles ===
In nanoparticle systems, the nonresonant nature of the interaction between bulk phonons and electrons prevents from directly applying the two-temperature model. Also, reduced dimensionality of nanosystems creates, on one hand, a quantum size effect (for particle sizes of around 5 nm), on the other, a geometric size effect, which enhances the electron–surface interaction and heat diffusion. The quantum size regime implies a split of the band structure into discrete levels, so that the partition function of electrons isn't the same as that of the bulk.

Moreover, the electronic mean-free path in metals is several hundred angstroms, so it is larger than the particles size even at high temperatures. Therefore, scattering events from the particle's surface can occur. In this conditions, the energy transfer from the electrons to the lattice (external thermalization) may become very slow, even slower than the internal thermalization process. This fact forces to use modified versions of the two-temperature model that introduce nonthermal energy distributions. These modified versions will be described in the section of this article that deals with extensions of the two-temperature model.

In 1997, M. Nisoli and colleagues studied, in the case of nanoparticles, the role of the crystalline lattice in the process of internal thermalization. To this aim, they performed femtosecond pump-probe measurements on gallium nanoparticles in both the liquid and the solid phase. In this way, they observed that, in both phases, the interaction between electrons and surface vibrational modes is prevalent.

== Applications to semiconductors ==
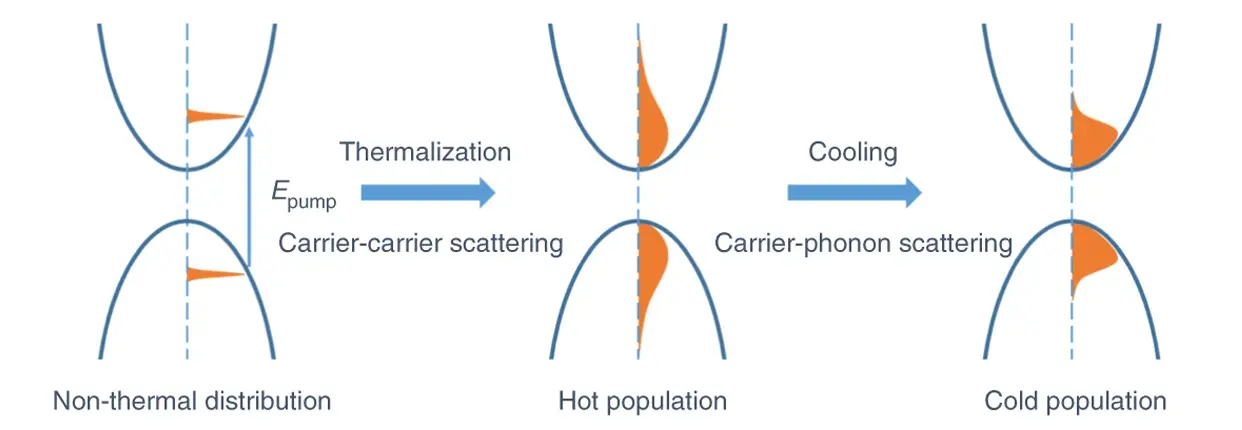
Schematic illustration of carrier relaxation processes. Initially, a non-thermal carrier energy distribution is excited. After undergoing carrier-carrier scattering, carriers form a thermalized distribution with a temperature higher than the lattice. Through carrier-phonon scattering, the carriers subsequently cool down until they reach an equilibrium with the lattice temperature.

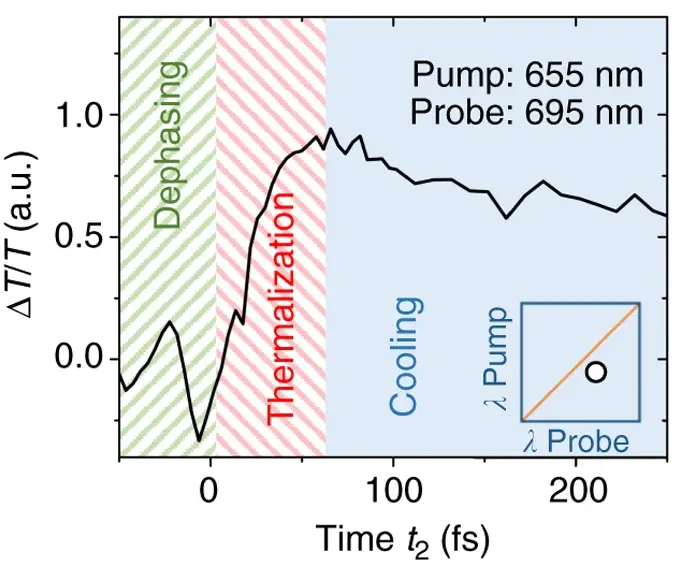
An example of carrier thermalization in perovskites. We can observe three different regimes: a coherent regime at negative times during which we observe spectral oscillations, a regime of internal thermalization, during which we observe a rise in the transient signal, and an external thermalization regime during which the signal slowly decays.

As described by J. M. Richter and colleagues in their article published in 2017, the assumptions of the two-temperature model can be applied to semiconductors too. Specifically, they describe the case of excitation through an ultrafast laser. Photoexcitation of a semiconductor leads to the formation of a population of hot charge carriers (electrons promoted to the conduction band and holes in the valence band). After a brief initial phase called "coherent regime" (which goes beyond the scope of this article and is destroyed by quantum dephasing processes), a regime of internal thermalization establishes: in this regime, the initial energy distribution of hot carriers matches that of the excitation laser pulse, but then ultrafast interactions such as carrier-carrier or carrier-optical-phonon scattering create a broadening of the energy distribution, till the Fermi-Dirac shape is reached. The timescale of internal thermalization of GaAs, the most widely studied semiconductor, is reported to be between 100 fs and 4 ps. The regime of external thermalization is then led by carrier-phonon and carrier-impurity scattering processes.

== Extensions of the model ==
The two-temperature model is well-supported by experimental evidence as pointed out in previous sections, especially when applied to metals. In particular, at high temperatures, the external thermalization time is observed to increase linearly with temperature. Also, in the case of noble metals and at high enough excitation fluences, the external thermalization time is observed to increase with fluence, as predicted by the model.

However, some other predictions of the model fail short of evidence. For instance, at low temperatures, the external thermalization time is predicted to increase as temperature decreases, but this effect was never observed. This fact shows that, as introduced above, the two-temperature model has some limitations. These limitations are inevitable, since the model, in order to be applicable, requires that its precise assumptions are met by the physical system, which is not always true.

To try to overcome these intrinsic limitations of the model, many authors tried to modify and extend it. As was mentioned in the previous paragraphs, the probable origin of the disagreement between simulations and experiments at low temperatures is reported to be the time overlap between internal and external thermalizations, whose timescales may become too similar.

To solve this issue, a first step was done by R. H. M. Groeneveld, R. Sprik and A. Lagendijk, who developed the so-called nonthermal electron model (NEM) and were able to account for the data on metallic $\ce{LuAgCu4}$($T_D=280 K$) down to about 50 kelvin. This nonthermal electron model assumes that, on the timescale of the external thermalization, the electrons still have a nonthermal distribution.

However, the paper by Groeneveld and colleagues still didn't capture the fact that, below 50 kelvin, experiments on $\ce{LuAgCu4}$ were showing an external thermalization timescale independent of temperature, while the two-temperature model predicted a $T^{-3}$ dependence. This point was further analysed by Ahn and colleagues, who performed extensive numerical simulations at low temperatures. They suggested that, assuming a nonthermal electron distribution in the model instead of the thermal one, the simulations resulted in a faster and less-temperature-dependent external thermalization process.

Recently, a paper by S. Sadasivam, M. Chan and P. Darancet suggested to further modify the two-temperature model in order to account for nonequilibrium phonon distributions and their effects on thermal relaxation of electrons. They performed simulations on semiconductor materials and suggested that departures of the electron and phonon dynamics from the two-temperature model predictions may stem from the breakdown of the hypothesis of thermal equilibrium within the lattice subsystem. They thus generalised the two-temperature model to account for slow phonon thermalization.

=== Three-temperature model (3TM) for magnetic materials ===
A major extension of the TTM is the three-temperature model (3TM), which is essential for describing ultrafast dynamics in ferromagnetic materials such as iron, cobalt, and nickel. Following excitation by a femtosecond laser pulse, the magnetic order in these materials can be destroyed on a sub-picosecond timescale in a process known as ultrafast demagnetization. The standard TTM, which only considers electrons and phonons, cannot account for this phenomenon as it neglects the magnetic degrees of freedom (the spin system).

The 3TM considers three distinct and coupled thermodynamic subsystems, each with its own temperature:

- The electron system ($T_e$)
- The phonon (lattice) system ($T_l$)
- The spin (magnon) system ($T_s$)

The laser pulse primarily deposits energy into the electron system. This energy is then transferred to both the lattice and the spin systems through distinct coupling channels: electron-phonon coupling ($G_{el}$) and electron-spin coupling ($G_{es}$). A typically weaker spin-lattice coupling ($G_{sl}$) also allows for energy exchange between those two subsystems.

The dynamics are described by a set of three coupled differential equations:

$C_e \frac{\partial T_e}{\partial t} = -G_{el}(T_e - T_l) - G_{es}(T_e - T_s) + Q(t)$

$C_l \frac{\partial T_l}{\partial t} = G_{el}(T_e - T_l) + G_{sl}(T_s - T_l)$

$C_s \frac{\partial T_s}{\partial t} = G_{es}(T_e - T_s) - G_{sl}(T_s - T_l)$

where $C_e$, $C_l$, and $C_s$ are the specific heats of the electron, lattice, and spin subsystems, respectively. The laser-driven excitation of the electronic subsystem is described via $Q(t)$.

In this model, the rapid increase in spin temperature due to the strong electron-spin coupling is responsible for the quenching of magnetization. This electron-magnon scattering is often the dominant energy dissipation channel for hot electrons in the initial femtoseconds and provides the physical mechanism behind ultrafast demagnetization.

==== Limitations and microscopic models ====
While the TTM and 3TM are powerful phenomenological models, their core assumption—that each subsystem is in a local thermal equilibrium and can be described by a temperature—is not always valid. For example, in bcc iron, the magnon population has been shown to behave in a highly non-thermal manner immediately after laser excitation. The energy distributions of the electrons, phonons, and magnons can deviate significantly from the Fermi-Dirac or Bose-Einstein statistics assumed by the temperature models.

To capture these non-thermal dynamics accurately, more fundamental, mode-resolved microscopic models are required. These approaches solve the time-dependent Boltzmann equation for the different particles, tracking their population in both energy and momentum space without assuming a predefined thermal distribution. Such models provide a more complete picture of the non-equilibrium dynamics of electrons, magnons, and phonons in materials driven far from equilibrium.

== See also ==
- Laser ablation
- Ultrafast laser
- Statistical Mechanics
- Mesoscopic Physics
- Fermi-Dirac statistics
- Electron excitation
