= NGC 2551 =

Galaxy in the constellation Camelopardalis

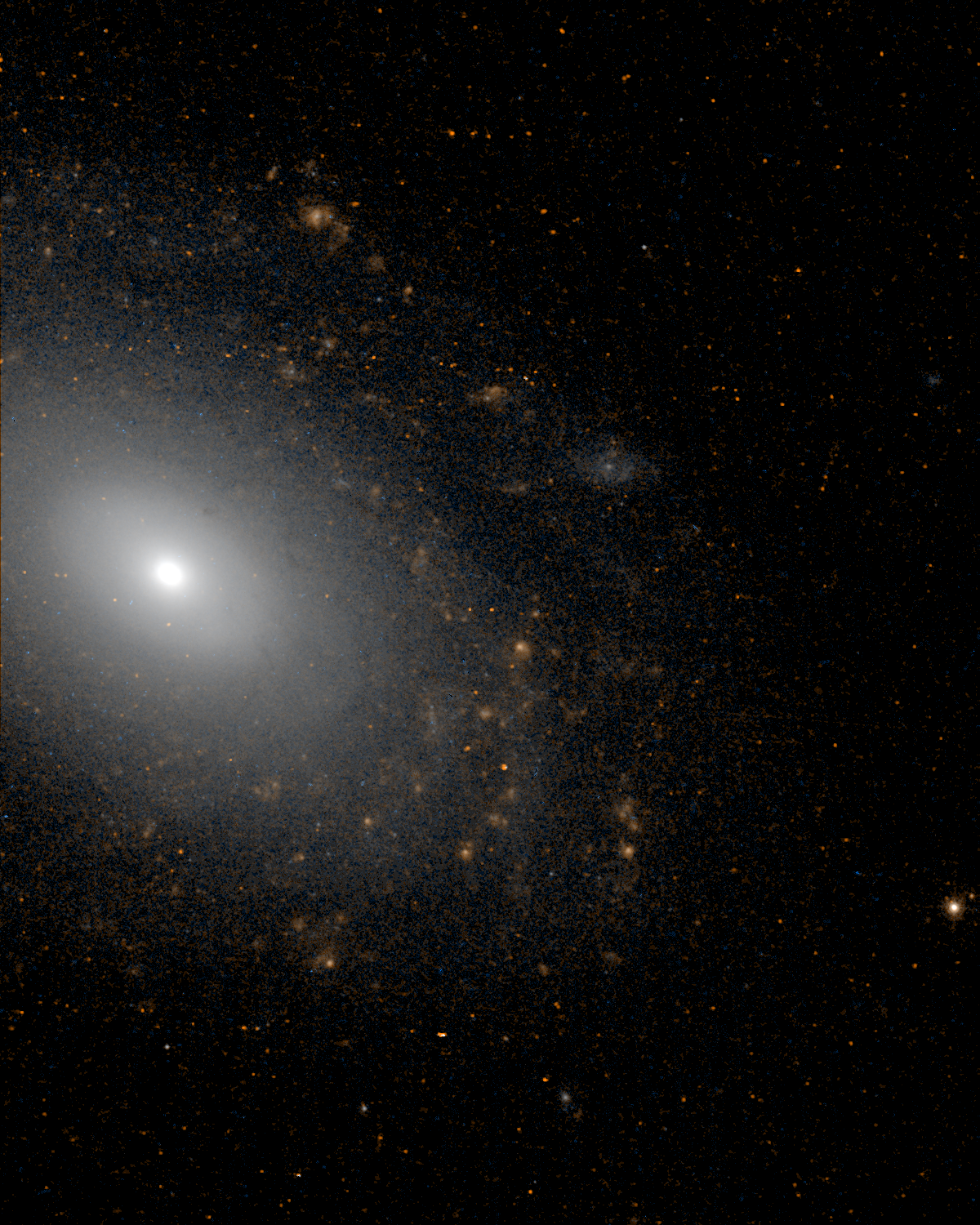
- NGC 2551 imaged by Hubble Space Telescope

Observation data (J2000 epoch)
- Constellation: Camelopardalis
- Right ascension: 08^{h} 24^{m} 50.2491^{s}
- Declination: +73° 24′ 43.354″
- Redshift: 0.007819 ± 0.000037
- Heliocentric radial velocity: 2,344 ± 11 km/s
- Distance: 118 ± 8.2 Mly (36.2 ± 2.5 Mpc)
- Group or cluster: NGC 2551 Group
- Apparent magnitude (V): 12.2

Characteristics
- Type: SA(s)0/a
- Size: ~58,000 ly (17.9 kpc) (estimated)
- Apparent size (V): 1.7′ × 1.1′

Other designations
- IRAS F08192+7334, UGC 4362, MCG +12-08-038, PGC 23608, CGCG 331-040

NGC 2551 is a lenticular galaxy in the constellation Camelopardalis. The galaxy lies about 120 million light years away from Earth, which means, given its apparent dimensions, that NGC 2551 is approximately 60,000 light years across. It was discovered by Wilhelm Tempel on August 9, 1882.

== Characteristics ==
NGC 2551 is categorised as a lenticular galaxy however the galaxy features spiral arms. The galaxy has two well defined narrow spiral arms and many arm fragments, with the spiral pattern being between a grand design galaxy and a multiple spiral arm pattern. The galaxy is seen at an inclination of 50°.

The galaxy has a disk of counter-rotating gas forming stars. It is possible the gas of the disk was accreted from a gas-rich satellite. The star formation rate of galaxy based on the H-alpha is estimated to be 0.65 M_{☉} per year. In ultraviolet a ring is visible lying 15 to 30 arcseconds from the nucleus. Apart from excitation from star formation there is also excitation from post-AGB stars and shocks in the northern inner part of the ring. The galaxy also has a hydrogen disk which appears disturbed, probably due to interactions with other galaxies.

=== Supernova ===
One supernova has been observed in NGC 2551, SN 2003hr. It was found by T. Boles on 31 August 2003 lying 48" west and 20".4 south of the centre of the galaxy at an apparent magnitude of 16.8. Its spectral analysis showed it was a type II supernova several months post maximum.

== Nearby galaxies ==
NGC 2551 is the foremost member of the NGC 2551 group, which also includes galaxies NGC 2550, UGC 4390, and UGC 4413. The group is part of the same galaxy cloud with NGC 2633, NGC 2634, NGC 2634A, and IC 2389. NGC 2551 forms a pair with LEDA 2755603, a diffuse companion galaxy lying 2 arcminutes away. UGC 4390 lies 14.4 arcminutes away.
