= Ilya Lifshitz =

Soviet physicist (1917–1982)

- Илья Лифшиц
- Born: Ilya Mikhailovich Lifshitz; January 13, 1917; Kharkov, Kharkov Governorate, Russian Empire
- Died: October 23, 1982 (aged 65); Moscow, Russian SFSR, Soviet Union
- Education: University of Kharkov; Kharkov Polytechnic Institute
- Known for: Lifshitz tails Lifshitz exponent Lifshitz–Kosevich formula Lifshitz transition Self-averaging; Spectral shift function Supersolid; Two temperature model
- Awards: Lenin Prize; Simon Memorial Prize (1961)
- Scientific career
- Fields: Physics
- Institutions: Kharkov Institute of Physics and Technology; Institute for Physical Problems
- Doctoral advisor: Lev Landau
- Doctoral students: Arnold Kosevich

Ilya Mikhailovich Lifshitz (Russian: Илья́ Миха́йлович Ли́фшиц; Ukrainian: Ілля́ Миха́йлович Лі́фшиць; January 13, 1917 – October 23, 1982) was a Soviet theoretical physicist. He is known for his works in solid-state physics, electron theory of metals, disordered systems, and the theory of polymers. His brother, Evgeny Lifshitz, was also a physicist.

== Work ==
Ilya Lifshitz was born into a Ukrainian Jewish family in Kharkov, Kharkov Governorate, Russian Empire (now Kharkiv, Ukraine). Together with Arnold Kosevich, in 1954 Lifshitz established the connection between the oscillation of magnetic characteristics of metals and the form of an electronic surface of Fermi (Lifshitz–Kosevich formula) from de Haas–van Alphen experiments.

Lifshitz was one of the founders of the theory of disordered systems. He introduced some of the basic notions, such as self-averaging, and discovered what is now called Lifshitz tails and Lifshitz singularity.

In perturbation theory, Lifshitz introduced the notion of spectral shift function, which was later developed by Mark Krein.

A phase transition involving topological changes of the material's Fermi surface is called a Lifshitz phase transition.

Starting from the late 1960s, Lifshitz started considering problems of statistical physics of polymers. Together with his students Alexander Grosberg and Alexei R. Khokhlov, Lifshitz proposed a theory of coil-to-globule transition in homopolymers and derived the formula for the conformational entropy of a polymer chain, that is referred to as the Lifshitz entropy.
