= Panayotis G. Kevrekidis =

Panayotis G. Kevrekidis is a professor in the Department of Mathematics and Statistics at the University of Massachusetts Amherst. Kevrekidis earned his B.Sc. in physics in 1996 from the University of Athens. He obtained his M.S. in 1998 and his MPhil and Ph.D. in 2000 from Rutgers University, the latter under the joint supervision of Joel Lebowitz and Panos G. Georgopoulos. His thesis was entitled “Lattice Dynamics of Solitary Wave Excitations”. He then assumed a post-doctoral position split between the Program in Applied and Computational Mathematics of Princeton University (10/2000–02/2001) and the Theoretical Division and the Center for Nonlinear Studies of Los Alamos National Laboratory (03/2001–08/2001). From 09/2001, he joined the Department of Mathematics and Statistics of the University of Massachusetts Amherst as an assistant professor. He was awarded tenure and promotion to associate professor in 06/2005. As of 09/2010, he is a full professor at the same institution. He is presently the Stanislaw M. Ulam Scholar at the Center for Nonlinear Studies at Los Alamos National Laboratory.

== Awards ==
Kevrekidis has received numerous awards and distinctions. These include a CAREER award in Applied Mathematics from the U.S. National Science Foundation (in 2003), a Humboldt Research Fellowship from the Humboldt Foundation, an Outstanding Paper Prize from the Society for Industrial and Applied Mathematics (SIAM), and the 2008 Stefanos Pnevmatikos International Award for research in nonlinear phenomena. In 2013 he was awarded the J.D. Crawford Prize of the Society for Industrial and Applied Mathematics for outstanding research in nonlinear science. and the A.F. Pallas award from the Academy of Athens. In 2014 he was elected a Fellow of the American Physical Society. He was elected as a fellow of the Society for Industrial and Applied Mathematics in 2017, "for fundamental contributions to the existence, stability, and dynamics of nonlinear waves with applications to atomic, optical, and materials physics". He was elected as a Fellow of the American Mathematical Society in the 2020 Class, for "contributions in applied mathematics, especially in the theory and applications of nonlinear waves".

== Research ==
His research has been supported by numerous sources such as the NSF, the US Air Force, the European Research Council, and numerous private Foundations (Alexander von Humboldt, Alexander S. Onassis Public Benefit Foundation, and US–Israel Binational Science Foundation). Kevrekidis's interests are centered around the nonlinear dynamics of solitary waves in nonlinear partial differential equations and in lattice nonlinear differential difference equations and the properties (existence, stability, dynamics) of such waves. A focal point of this work concerns the applications of such tools and techniques to systems from physics (especially nonlinear optics and atomic physics), and materials science, biology and chemistry. He has published over 450 research papers in a wide variety of venues in nonlinear physics and applied mathematics, given over 130 research lectures in conferences and universities around the globe, is an associate editor of 3 journals and has authored 4 books; the first is entitled Emergent Nonlinear Phenomena in Bose-Einstein Condensates and is prefaced by Wolfgang Ketterle, one of the Nobel Prize Winners in that field, while the second is entitled The Discrete Nonlinear Schrödinger Equation: Mathematical Analysis, Numerical Computations and Physical Perspectives. They were published by Springer-Verlag in 2008 and 2009, respectively. He published his third book in November 2013, an edited volume together with a number of his collaborators on Localized Excitations in Nonlinear Complex Systems: Current State of the Art and Future Perspectives, again by Springer-Verlag and his fourth book in 2014 with two co-editors on The sine-Gordon Model and its Applications: From Pendula and Josephson Junctions to Gravity and High Energy Physics. As quantitative measures of his impact to the research community, one can mention the h-index of 42 (in Web of Science, 52 in Google Scholar) and that his work (excluding self-citations) has been cited over 5300 times.

Kevrekidis has created a tradition on nonlinear waves within the University of Massachusetts Amherst. He has graduated 8 PhD students, two of which hold tenure-track appointments (in UIUC and Cameron University), one that holds a staff member position at ORNL, two of which hold post-doctoral fellowships (at Los Alamos National Laboratory and at the University of Dallas) and three of which work in industry (being research analysts for Bank of America and for the CCC information services company). He has worked with 5 post-doctoral research scholars; alumni of this group hold now permanent positions at the University of Essex in the UK, the CNRS in France, and Bowdoin College, among others.
