= Self-averaging =

A self-averaging physical property of a disordered system is one that can be described by averaging over a sufficiently large sample. The concept was introduced by Ilya Mikhailovich Lifshitz.

== Definition ==
Frequently in physics one comes across situations where quenched randomness plays an important role. Any physical property X of such a system, would require an averaging over all disorder realisations. The system can be completely described by the average [X] where [...] denotes averaging over realisations (“averaging over samples”) provided the relative variance R_{X} = V_{X} / [X]^{2} → 0 as N→∞, where V_{X} = [X^{2}] − [X]^{2} and N denotes the size of the realisation. In such a scenario a single large system is sufficient to represent the whole ensemble. Such quantities are called self-averaging. Away from criticality, when the larger lattice is built from smaller blocks, then due to the additivity property of an extensive quantity, the central limit theorem guarantees that R_{X} ~ N^{−1} thereby ensuring self-averaging. On the other hand, at the critical point, the question whether $X$ is self-averaging or not becomes nontrivial, due to long range correlations.

== Non self-averaging systems ==
At the pure critical point randomness is classified as relevant if, by the standard definition of relevance, it leads to a change in the critical behaviour (i.e., the critical exponents) of the pure system. It has been shown by recent renormalization group and numerical studies that self-averaging property is lost if randomness or disorder is relevant. Most importantly as N → ∞, R_{X} at the critical point approaches a constant. Such systems are called non self-averaging. Thus unlike the self-averaging scenario, numerical simulations cannot lead to an improved picture in larger lattices (large N), even if the critical point is exactly known. In summary, various types of self-averaging can be indexed with the help of the asymptotic size dependence of a quantity like R_{X}. If R_{X} falls off to zero with size, it is self-averaging whereas if R_{X} approaches a constant as N → ∞, the system is non-self-averaging.

== Strong and weak self-averaging ==
There is a further classification of self-averaging systems as strong and weak. If the exhibited behavior is R_{X} ~ N^{−1} as suggested by the central limit theorem, mentioned earlier, the system is said to be strongly self-averaging. Some systems shows a slower power law decay R_{X} ~ N^{−z} with 0 < z < 1. Such systems are classified weakly self-averaging. The known critical exponents of the system determine the exponent z.

It must also be added that relevant randomness does not necessarily imply non self-averaging, especially in a mean-field scenario. The RG arguments mentioned above need to be extended to situations with sharp limit of T_{c} distribution and long range interactions.
