= Magnetosphere particle motion =

A sketch of Earth's magnetic field representing the source of Earth's magnetic field as a magnet The North Pole of Earth is near the top of the diagram, the South Pole near the bottom. Notice that the South Pole of that magnet is deep in Earth's interior below Earth's North Magnetic Pole. Earth's magnetic field is produced in the outer liquid part of its core due to a dynamo that produce electrical currents there.

The ions and electrons of a plasma interacting with the Earth's magnetic field generally follow its magnetic field lines. These represent the force that a north magnetic pole would experience at any given point. (Denser lines indicate a stronger force.) Plasmas exhibit more complex second-order behaviors, studied as part of magnetohydrodynamics.

A simulation of a charged particle being deflected from the Earth by the magnetosphere.

Thus in the "closed" model of the magnetosphere, the magnetopause boundary between the magnetosphere and the solar wind is outlined by field lines. Not much plasma can cross such a stiff boundary. Its only "weak points" are the two polar cusps, the points where field lines closing at noon (-z axis GSM) get separated from those closing at midnight (+z axis GSM); at such points the field intensity on the boundary is zero, posing no barrier to the entry of plasma. (This simple definition assumes a noon-midnight plane of symmetry, but closed fields lacking such symmetry also must have cusps, by the fixed point theorem.)

The amount of solar wind energy and plasma entering the actual magnetosphere depends on how far it departs from such a "closed" configuration, i.e. the extent to which Interplanetary Magnetic Field field lines manage to cross the boundary. As discussed further below, that extent depends very much on the direction of the Interplanetary Magnetic Field, in particular on its southward or northward slant.

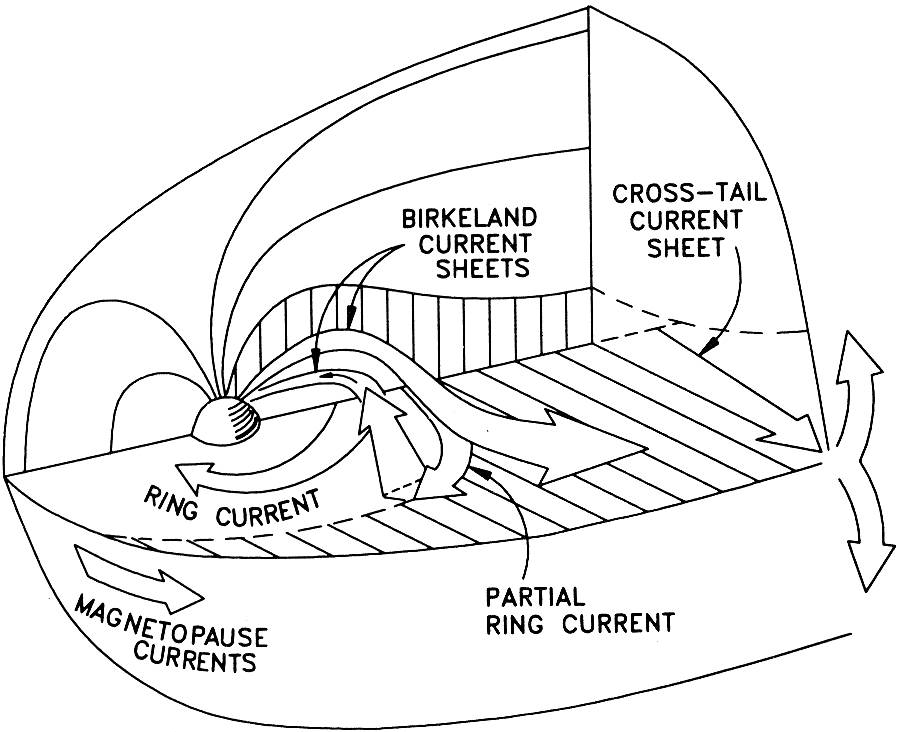
Schematic view of the different current systems which shape the Earth's magnetosphere

Trapping of plasma, e.g. of the ring current, also follows the structure of field lines. A particle interacting with this B field experiences a Lorentz Force which is responsible for many of the particle motion in the magnetosphere. Furthermore, Birkeland currents and heat flow are also channeled by such lines — easy along them, blocked in perpendicular directions. Indeed, field lines in the magnetosphere have been likened to the grain in a log of wood, which defines an "easy" direction along which it easily gives way.

== Motion of charged particles ==
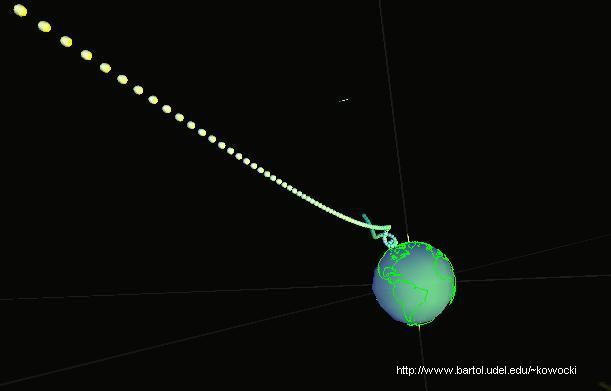
A simulated charged particle, its trajectory determined primarily by the Earth's magnetosphere.

The simplest magnetic field B is a constant one– straight parallel field lines and constant field intensity. In such a field, if an ion or electron enters perpendicular to the field lines, it can be shown to move in a circle (the field only needs to be constant in the region covering the circle). If q is the charge of the particle, m its mass, v its velocity and R_{g} the radius of the circle ("gyration radius"), all one needs do is notice that the centripetal force mv^{2}/R_{g} must equal the magnetic force qvB. One gets

$R_g=mv/(qB)$

If the initial velocity of the particle has a different direction, one only needs resolve it into a component v_{⊥}perpendicular to B and a component v_{//} parallel to B, and replace v in the above formula with v_{⊥}.

If W_{⊥}=m v_{⊥}^{2}/2 is the energy associated with the perpendicular motion in electron-volts (all calculations here are non-relativistic), in a field of B nT (nanotesla), then R_{g} in kilometers is

For protons: R_{g} = (144/B) √W_{⊥}

For electrons: R_{g} = (3.37/B) √W_{⊥}

The velocity parallel to the field v_{//} is not affected by the field, because no magnetic force exists in that direction. That velocity just stays constant (as long as the field does), and adding the two motions together gives a spiral around a central guiding field line. If the field curves or changes, the motion is modified, but the general character of spiraling around a central field line persists: hence the name "guiding center motion."

Because the magnetic force is perpendicular to the velocity, it performs no work and requires no energy—nor does it provide any. Thus magnetic fields (like the Earth's) can profoundly affect particle motion in them, but need no energy input to maintain their effect.

== Magnetic Mirroring and Magnetic Drift ==
The spacing between field lines is an indicator of the relative strength of the magnetic field. Where magnetic field lines converge the field grows stronger, and where they diverge, weaker.

Now, it can be shown that in the motion of gyrating particles, the "magnetic moment" μ = W_{⊥}/B (or relativistically, p_{⊥}^{2}/2mγB) stays very nearly constant. The "very nearly" qualifier sets it apart from true constants of motion, such as energy, reducing it to merely an "adiabatic invariant." For most plasmas in the magnetosphere, the deviation from constancy is negligible.

The conservation of μ is tremendously important (in laboratory plasmas as well as in space). Suppose the field line guiding a particle, the axis of its spiral path, belongs to a converging bundle of lines, so that the particle is led into an increasingly larger B. To keep μ constant, W_{⊥} must also grow.

However, as noted before, the total energy of a particle in a "purely magnetic" field remains constant. What therefore happens is that energy is converted, from the part associated with the parallel motion v_{//} to the perpendicular part. As v_{//} decreases, the angle between v and B then increases, until it reaches 90°. At that point W_{⊥} contains all the available energy, it can grow no more and no further advance into the stronger field can occur.

The result is known as magnetic mirroring. The particle briefly gyrates perpendicular to its guiding field line, and then retreats back to the weaker field, the spiral unwinding again in the process. It may be noted that such motion was first derived by Henri Poincaré in 1895, for a charged particle in the field of a magnetic monopole, whose field lines are all straight and converge to a point. The conservation of μ was only pointed by Alfvén about 50 years later, and the connection to adiabatic invariant was only made afterwards.

Magnetic mirroring makes possible the "trapping" in the dipole-like field lines near Earth of particles in the radiation belt and in the ring current. On all such lines the field is much stronger at their ends near Earth, compared to its strength when it crosses the equatorial plane. Assuming such particles are somehow placed in the equatorial region of that field, most of them stay trapped, because every time their motion along the field line brings them into the strong field region, they "get mirrored" and bounce back and forth between hemispheres. Only particles whose motion is very close to parallel to the field line, with near-zero μ, avoid mirroring—and these are quickly absorbed by the atmosphere and lost. Their loss leaves a bundle of directions around the field line which is empty of particles—the "loss cone".

In addition to gyrating around their guiding field lines and bouncing back and forth between mirror points, trapped particles also drift slowly around Earth, switching guiding field lines but staying at approximately the same distance (another adiabatic invariant is involved, "the second invariant"). This motion was mentioned earlier in connection with the ring current.

One reason for the drift is that the intensity of B increases as Earth is approached. The gyration around the guiding field line is therefore not a perfect circle, but curves a little more tightly on the side closer to the Earth, where the larger B gives a smaller R_{g}. This change in curvature makes ions advance sideways, while electrons, which gyrate in the opposite sense, advance sideways in the opposite direction. The net result, as already noted, produces the ring current, though additional effects (like non-uniform distribution of plasma density) also affect the result.

== Plasma fountain ==
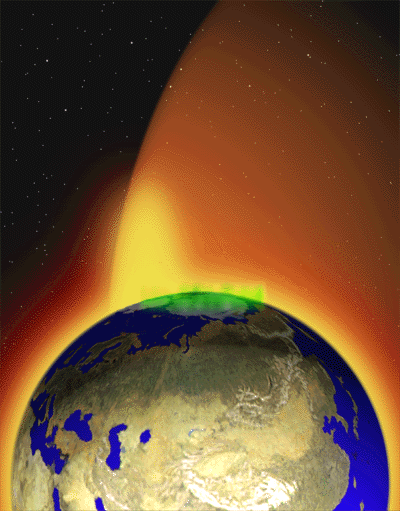
The Earth's "plasma fountain", showing oxygen, helium, and hydrogen ions which gush into space from regions near the Earth's poles. The faint yellow area shown above the north pole represents gas lost from Earth into space; the green area is the aurora borealis-or plasma energy pouring back into the atmosphere.

In the 1980s, a "plasma fountain" of hydrogen, helium, and oxygen ions was discovered flowing from the Earth's North Pole.
