= Photoexcitation =

Photons that excite electrons to a higher energy level in an atom

An illustration of electron excitation, showing excitation by photon (left) and by particle collision (right). This is the simplest case of photoexcitation, sinca a single photon excites a single quantum particle.

Photoexcitation is a phenomenon in physics where an excited state of a quantum system (an atom or a molecule) is created by photon absorption. The excited state originates from the interaction between a photon and the quantum system when the energy of the photon is too low to cause photoionization. A very simple example of this process is electron excitation.

A photon's energy is directly proportional to the frequency of its associated electromagnetic wave. Thus, light with lower frequencies is associated to photons with a lower energy. In contrast, light with higher frequencies is associated to photons with a higher energy. The absorption of the photon takes place in accordance with the theory of quantum mechanics.

Photoexcitation plays a role in different subjects of physics and chemistry:

- Photochemistry
- Luminescence
- Photoisomerization
- Photoelectrochemistry

Moreover, photoexcitation is exploited by many different devices, such as:

- Solar cells, electronic devices that convert the energy of light directly into electricity by means of the photovoltaic effect.
- Optically pumped lasers, devices that emit light through a process of optical amplification based on the stimulated emission of electromagnetic radiation.
- Photochromic applications. Photochromism causes a transformation of two forms of a molecule by absorbing a photon. For example, the BIPS molecule(2H-l-benzopyran-2,2-indolines) can convert from trans to cis and back by absorbing a photon. The different forms are associated with different absorption bands. In a cis-form of BIPS, the transient absorption band has a value of 21050 cm^{−1}, in contrast to the band from the trans-form, that has a value of 16950 cm^{−1}. The results were optically visible, where the BIPS in gels turned from a colorless appearance to a brown or pink color after repeatedly being exposed to a high energy UV pump beam. High energy photons cause a transformation in the BIPS molecule making the molecule change its structure.

On the nuclear scale photoexcitation includes the production of nucleon and delta baryon resonances in nuclei.

== See also ==
- Electron excitation
- Photon
- Photochemistry
- Photoelectrochemistry
- Photovoltaic effect
- Two temperature model
