= Alan R. Bishop =

British-American physicist

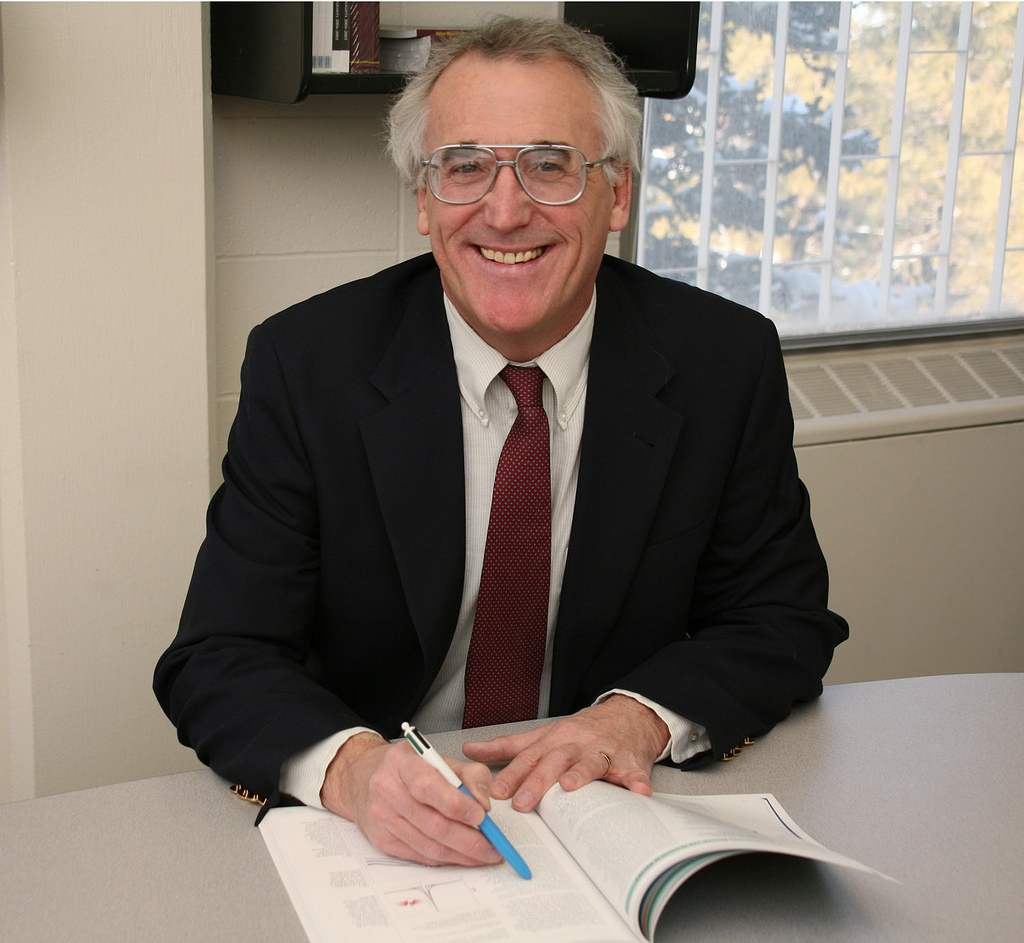
- Education: University of East Anglia; Trinity College, Cambridge
- Awards: E. O. Lawrence Award (1993); Los Alamos Medal (2024)
- Scientific career
- Workplaces: Los Alamos National Laboratory
- Thesis: Quantum theory of electron transport and localization (1973)

Alan Reginald Bishop is an internationally recognized British/American physicist and academic, specializing in condensed matter theory, statistical physics, and nonlinear physics. He retired as Principal Associate Director - Science, Technology, and Engineering at Los Alamos National Laboratory in 2018.

He has made major contributions in the areas of solitons, quantum complexity, structural and magnetic transitions, collective excitations in low-dimensional organic and inorganic materials and complex electronic materials with strong spin-charge-lattice coupling. Among his numerous seminal contributions, the Peyrard-Bishop model of DNA denaturation is well known. He is a Fellow of the American Physical Society (1983), Humboldt Foundation Senior Fellow (2000), Fellow of Los Alamos National Laboratory (2004), Fellow of the American Association for the Advancement of Science (2006), and Fellow of Institute of Physics (UK, 2011). He has edited about 20 books and journal issues. He has served as a consultant with IBM Research Lab, Zurich, Max-Planck Institute, Stuttgart, International Centre for Theoretical Physics, Trieste among many others. He has published more than 750 papers with over 32,000 citations and an h-index of 82 (Google Scholar).

Born in Staffordshire, England, he was educated at the University of East Anglia and Trinity College, Cambridge (PhD, 1973). He obtained his Ph.D. with (future, 1977) Nobel Laureates Sir Neville Mott and Philip W. Anderson. After positions as a junior research fellow at Oxford University (with Sir Roger Elliott), research associate at Cornell University (with future, 1989, APS president Jim Krumhansl) and a lecturer at University of London, he arrived at Los Alamos National Laboratory as a staff scientist in 1979. In 1980 he co-founded the Center for Nonlinear Studies (CNLS) at Los Alamos and served as its Acting/Deputy Chairman. During 1984 – 1999 he was the group leader of the Condensed Matter and Statistical Physics Group, then during 1999 – 2006 as Division Leader of the Theoretical Division. From 2006 – 2011 he served as the associate director for theory, simulation and computing and finally became the principal associate director for science, technology and engineering (during 2011- 2018). Currently he is a senior lab fellow and a guest scientist. He was awarded the Ernest Orlando Lawrence Award in 1993. In 2024, he was awarded the Los Alamos Medal, the laboratory's highest honor. He has also served on a dozen advisory boards, including at the Mind Institute, Albuquerque. He is on the committee of the Stefanos Pnevmatikos International Award.
