= Rigidity (electromagnetism) =

In particle physics, rigidity $R$ is a measure of the resistance of a particle to deflection by magnetic fields, defined as the particle's momentum divided by its charge. For a fully ionised nucleus moving at relativistic speed, this is equivalent to the energy per atomic number. It is an important quantity in accelerator physics and astroparticle physics.

== Definitions ==
=== Motion within a magnetic field ===
The concept of rigidity is derived from the motion of a charged particle within a magnetic field: two particles follow the same trajectory through a magnetic field if they have the same rigidity, even if they have different masses and charges. This situation arises in many particle accelerator and particle detector designs.

If a charged particle enters a uniform magnetic field, with the field orientated perpendicular to the initial velocity, the Lorentz force accelerates the particle in the direction which is perpendicular to both the velocity and magnetic field vectors. The resulting circular motion of the particle has a radius known as the gyroradius $r_p$. The rigidity is then defined as:

$R = B \times r_p$

where $B$ is the magnetic field. In this definition, the units of rigidity R are tesla-metres (N·s/C).

=== Energy per unit charge ===
Alternatively, an entirely equivalent definition of rigidity is:

$R = {pc \over q}$

where $p$ is the momentum of the particle, $c$ is the speed of light, and $q$ is the electric charge of the particle. For a fully ionised atomic nucleus moving at relativistic speed, this simplifies to

$R = {E \over Z}$

where $E$ is the particle energy and $Z$ is the atomic number. In this case the units of rigidity R are volts. This definition is often utilised in the study of cosmic rays, where the mass and charge of each particle is generally unknown.

== Conversions ==
If the particle momentum $p$, is given in units of GeV/c, then the rigidity in tesla-metres is:

${R \over \text{Tm}} = 3.3356 \text{ s/m} \times {p \over \text{GeV}/c} {c \over q}$

where the factor 3.3356 (which has units of seconds per metre) is $10^9$ (giga-) divided by the speed of light in m/s.
