= Arnold Kosevich =

Physicist

Arnold Markovych Kosevich (Ukrainian: Арнольд Маркович Косе́вич; July 7, 1928 – October 3, 2006) was a Soviet and Ukrainian physicist, known for contributions to the theoretical understanding of metals and crystals.

== Biography ==
Arnold Kosevich was born in Tulchyn, Ukraine. He graduated from Kharkiv University in 1951, and received his PhD in 1954 under the supervision of Ilya Lifshitz. In 1954–1957 he worked at Chernivtsi University, in 1957–1974 at the Kharkiv Institute of Physics and Technology. In the years 1974–2003 he headed the department of theoretical physics at the Verkin Institute for Low Temperature Physics and Engineering.

In 1990, he was elected corresponding member of the National Academy of Sciences of Ukraine. He was twice awarded with the State Prizes of Ukraine (1978, 2001). In 1999 he received the Sinelnikov Prize of the National Academy of Sciences of Ukraine. In 2004. he was awarded the title of Doctor (honoris causa) of Kharkiv National University. He was on the committee of the Stefanos Pnevmatikos International Award until his death.

== Work ==
Arnold Kosevich worked on the theoretical researches of electronic properties of metals, mechanics of real crystals and magnetoordered systems, and nonlinear dynamics of the condensed media. Together with I. M. Lifshitz, he established (1954) the connection between the oscillation of magnetic characteristics of metals (De Haas–van Alphen effect) and the form of a Fermi surface (now called the Lifshitz–Kosevich formula). In 1953 he discovered the phenomenon of quantum dimensional effect in conducting films (the invention was registered in 1977).

== Selected publications ==
1. A.M.Kosevich, Dislocations in the Theory of Elasticity, Kyiv, Naukova Dumka, 1978.
2. A.M.Kosevich, Crystal Dislocations and Theory of Elasticity, in: “ Dislocations in Solids ”, ed. F.R.N. Nabarro, North Holland, 1979, 1, p. 33.
3. A.M.Kosevich, Physical Mechanics of Real Crystals, Kyiv, Naukova Dumka, 1981 (in Russian); translated into Polish: Wroclaw, Wydavnitctwo Uniwersitetu Wroclawskogo, 2000.
4. E.M.Lifshits, A.M.Kosevich, Chapter "Dislocations", in the book by L.D.Landau, E.M.Lifshits. “Theory of Elasticity ”, Moscow, 1986, p. 149 (in Russian); translated into English:. Pergamon Press, p. 108,1986.
5. A.M.Kosevich, Theory of Crystal Lattice, Kharkiv State University, Vishcha Shkola, Kharkiv, 1988 (in Russian); Translated into English: WILEY-VCH, Berlin, New York, 1999.
6. V.S.Bojko, R.I.Garber, A.M.Kosevich, Reversible Crystal Plasticity, Moscow, Science, 1991 (in Russian); Translated into English: American Institute of Physics, New York, 1994.
7. A.M.Kosevich, E.S.Syrkin, S.B.Feodosyev, Particle Frequency Distribution Functions and the Problem of the Localization of the Atomic Vibrations in Real and Multilayered Crystals, in: “Die Kunst of Phonons”: Lectures from the Winter School of Theoretical Physics, February 15–27, Hudova Zdrej, Poland, T. Paszkewicz and K.Rapcewics, Plenum Press, 1994, p. 33.
8. Yu.A.Kosevich, E.S.Syrkin, A.M. Kosevich, Vibrations Localized Near Surface and Interfaces in Nontraditional Crystals (review), Progress in Surface Science, 55, No 1 (1997).
9. A.M. Kosevich, Topology and Solid State Physics (review), FNT 30, 2, 2004.
10. Arnold M.Kosevich, The Crystal Lattice. Phonons, Solitons, Dislocations, Superlattices(Second Edition), "WILEY-VCH", Weinheim, 2005
11. Kosevich A.M., Kovalev A.S.(8 entries) Encyclopedia of Nonlinear Science, "Routledge"США, New York and London, 2005
