= Stefanos Pnevmatikos International Award =

- Awarded for: Outstanding young researcher in the fields of nonlinear physics, mathematical physics, nonlinear disordered systems
- First award: 1992
- Website: Stefanos Pnevmatikos International Award

The Stefanos Pnevmatikos International Award is an award of the Foundation for Research & Technology – Hellas (FORTH) that was founded in 1991 and first awarded in 1992. It is named in honor of Stefanos Pnevmatikos, a researcher of nonlinear physics. The award is presented every two years to young researchers of nonlinear physics, mathematical physics, or nonlinear disordered systems. The award is coordinated by the University of Crete Department of Physics and is sponsored by the Foundation for Research & Technology – Hellas. The committee is headed by George P. Tsironis and includes Alan R. Bishop, Michel Peyrard, Serge Aubry, David Kelly Campbell, Vladimir E. Zakharov, and formerly included Arnold Kosevich and Alwyn Scott. The award has been suspended due to the Greek government-debt crisis.

== Recipients ==
The award has been given to the following people.

- 2008: Panayotis G. Kevrekidis
- 2006: Tsampikos Kottos
- 2004: Peter Hamm
- 2002: Sergej Flach
- 2000: Raymond E. Goldstein
- 1998: Alexey Ustinov
- 1996: George P. Tsironis
- 1994: Yuri Kivshar
- 1992: Robert Sinclair MacKay

== See also ==
- CAP-CRM Prize in Theoretical and Mathematical Physics
