= Sergej Flach =

German theoretical physicist

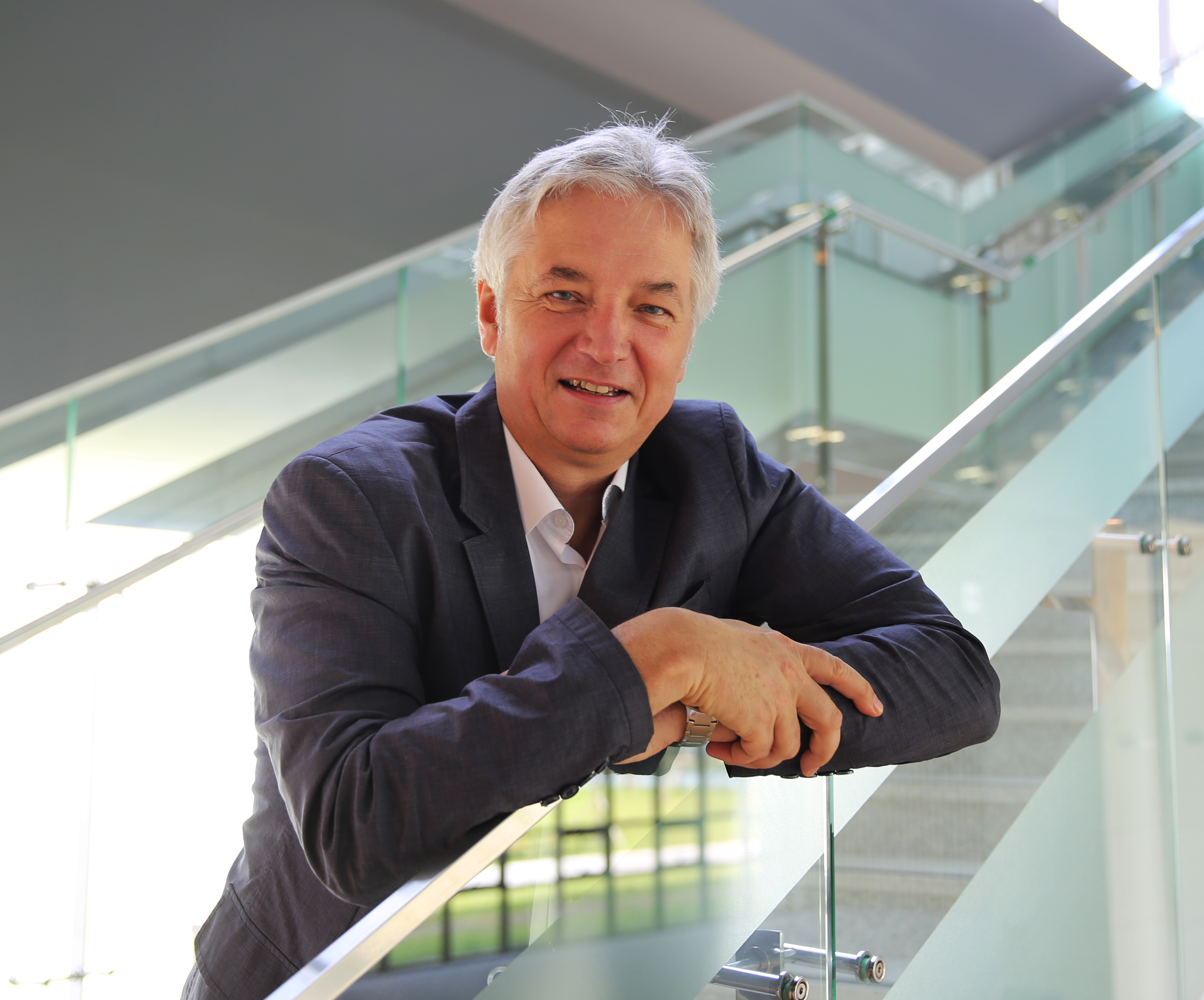
- Education: TU Dresden
- Awards: Stefanos Pnevmatikos International Award, Alexander von Humboldt Foundation Fellow (Sonderstipendiat), Prize of the Joint Institute for Nuclear Research
- Scientific career
- Fields: Condensed matter, photonics, statistical physics, nonlinear dynamics and chaos
- Workplaces: Institute for Basic Science
- Doctoral advisors: Jürgen Schreiber, Paul Ziesche
- Other academic advisors: Nikolay Plakida, Wolfgang Götze, Chuck Willis
- Website: IBS Center for Theoretical Physics of Complex Systems

Sergej Flach is a theoretical physicist whose research has spanned a number of scientific fields in his career. With about 240 publications to his name, his research has been cited over 16,000 times giving him an h-index of 58 and i10-index of 174. He is a member of the American Physical Society, German Physical Society, Korean Physical Society, and New Zealand Institute of Physics. He is an editorial board member of Chaos (2016-) and was an editorial board member of Physical Review E (2009–2011).

He is the founding director of the Center for Theoretical Physics of Complex Systems at the Institute for Basic Science (IBS), a professor at the University of Science and Technology, and an honorary research fellow at the New Zealand Institute for Advanced Study in Massey University.

== Education ==
He received his Masters (Diplom) in 1986 and PhD (Promotion) and Habilitation in theoretical physics in 1989 and 1998, respectively, at TU Dresden, Germany. His PhD thesis focused on the analysis of long time correlations of the lattice dynamics of crystals close to structural phase transitions and attempts to explain the central peak phenomenon observed e.g. in SrTiO_{3} and BaTiO_{3}.

== Career ==
During his Promotion study, he was a research assistant at TU Dresden until 1992, in which he started postdoc work in the Physics Department at Boston University. The independent postdoc was funded with a postdoctoral fellowship from the Deutsche Forschungsgemeinschaft (German Research Foundation). His host was Prof. Chuck Willis and Flach worked on the observation and properties of discrete breathers – generic exact localized solutions of broad classes of nonlinear lattice wave systems. In 1994, he was a guest scientist at Max Planck Institute for the Physics of Complex Systems in Dresden and later his position changed to become the head of visitors program in 1997. In 2012, he was a physics professor at the Centre for Theoretical Chemistry and Physics part of the New Zealand Institute for Advanced Study in Massey University Albany campus until 2016.

He moved to South Korea to become director of the Center for Theoretical Physics of Complex Systems at the Institute for Basic Science (IBS) in 2014. The goals of the center include being a renowned laboratory for quantum dynamics and nonlinear classical nano-structured systems and research the interfaces of applied and computational theoretical condensed matter physics and optics. The following year he became a professor at the University of Science and Technology (UST) in Daejeon and in 2017 renewed his connection with Massey University as an honorary research fellow.

In addition to writing academic journal publications, Flach has contributed as an editorial board member of Chaos (since 2016) and Physical Review E (2009–2011). He has also co-edited a book and guest edited special journal issues. And he has written sections or chapters in books, three issues of Physics Reports and one issue of Reviews of Modern Physics.

== Known for ==
- Discrete breathers: contributions to theoretical and experimental observation of localizing classical and quantum interacting waves on lattices
- Hamiltonian ratchets: derived symmetries of driven systems in space-time and controlled ways of breaking to obtain transport
- Q-breathers: contributions to the explanation of the Fermi-Pasta-Ulam paradox of statistical physics using periodic orbit theories
- Fano resonances in nanoscale structures: contributions to explanation and observation of Fano resonances in various settings of nanoscale devices, in particular photonic and plasmonic ones
- Universal destruction of Anderson localization for classical interacting waves: computational and analytical contributions to the explanation of universal dynamics of nonlinear disordered waves
- Flatband networks: introduced compact localized state based classifications

== Honors and awards ==
- 2002: Stefanos Pnevmatikos Award in Nonlinear Science for contributions in the theory of discrete breathers with applications to localized modes in atomic and molecular crystals and to coupled arrays of Josephson junctions
- 1991: Alexander von Humboldt Foundation Fellow (Sonderstipendiat), TU Muenchen
- 1989: Prize of the Joint Institute for Nuclear Research for work on anharmonic models of high-temperature superconductors, prize shared with V. L. Aksenov, Nikolay Bogolyubov, S. L. Drechsler and N. M. Plakida
