= Landau levels =

Quantization of cyclotron orbits

In quantum mechanics, the energies of cyclotron orbits of charged particles in a uniform magnetic field are quantized to discrete values, thus known as Landau levels. These levels are degenerate, with the number of electrons per level directly proportional to the strength of the applied magnetic field. It is named after the Soviet physicist Lev Landau who developed the theory in 1930.

Landau quantization contributes towards magnetic susceptibility of metals, known as Landau diamagnetism. Under strong magnetic fields, Landau quantization leads to oscillations in electronic properties of materials as a function of the applied magnetic field known as the De Haas–Van Alphen and Shubnikov–de Haas effects.

Landau quantization is a key ingredient in explanation of the integer quantum Hall effect.

== Derivation ==
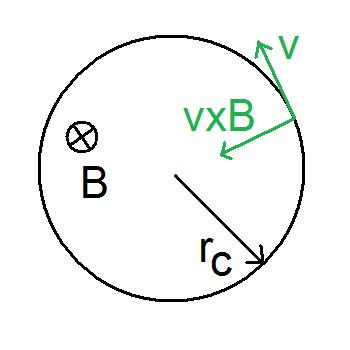
Diagram of a cyclotron orbit of a particle with speed v, which is the classical trajectory of a charged particle (here positive charge) under a uniform magnetic field B. The Landau quantization refers to a quantum charged particle under a uniform magnetic field.

Consider a system of non-interacting particles with charge q and spin S confined to an area A = L_{x}L_{y} in the x-y plane. Apply a uniform magnetic field
$$\mathbf{B} = \begin{pmatrix}0\\0\\B\end{pmatrix}$$
along the z-axis. In SI units, the Hamiltonian of this system (here, the effects of spin are neglected) is
$$\hat{H} = \frac{1}{2m} \left(\hat{\mathbf{p}} - q\hat{\mathbf{A}}\right)^2.$$
Here, $\hat{\mathbf{p}}$ is the canonical momentum operator and $\hat{\mathbf{A}}$ is the operator for the electromagnetic vector potential $\mathbf{A}$ (in position space $\hat{\mathbf{A}} =\mathbf{A}$).

The vector potential is related to the magnetic field by $\mathbf{B}=\mathbf{\nabla}\times \mathbf{A}.$

There is some gauge freedom in the choice of vector potential for a given magnetic field. The Hamiltonian is gauge invariant, which means that adding the gradient of a scalar field to A changes the overall phase of the wave function by an amount corresponding to the scalar field. But physical properties are not influenced by the specific choice of gauge.

=== In the Landau gauge ===
From the possible solutions for A, a gauge fixing introduced by Lev Landau is often used for charged particles in a constant magnetic field.

When
$$\mathbf{B} = \begin{pmatrix} 0 \\ 0 \\ B \end{pmatrix}$$
then
$$\mathbf{A} = \begin{pmatrix} 0 \\ B\cdot x \\ 0 \end{pmatrix}$$
is a possible solution in the Landau gauge (not to be mixed up with the Landau $R_\xi$ gauge).

In this gauge, the Hamiltonian is
$$\hat{H} = \frac{\hat{p}_x^2}{2m} + \frac{1}{2m} \left(\hat{p}_y - qB\hat{x}\right)^2 + \frac{\hat{p}_z^2}{2m}.$$
The operator $\hat{p}_y$ commutes with this Hamiltonian, since the operator $\hat y$ is absent for this choice of gauge. Thus the operator $\hat{p}_y$ can be replaced by its eigenvalue $\hbar k_y$. Since $\hat{z}$ does not appear in the Hamiltonian and only the z-momentum appears in the kinetic energy, this motion along the z-direction is a free motion.

The Hamiltonian can also be written more simply by noting that the cyclotron frequency is $\omega_c=qB/m$, giving
$$\hat{H} = \frac{\hat{p}_x^2}{2m} + \frac{1}{2} m \omega_{\rm c}^2 \left( \hat{x} - \frac{\hbar k_y}{m \omega_{\rm c}} \right)^2 + \frac{\hat{p}_z^2}{2m}.$$
This is exactly the Hamiltonian for the quantum harmonic oscillator, except with the minimum of the potential shifted in coordinate space by $x_0=\hbar k_y/m\omega_c$.

To find the energies, note that translating the harmonic oscillator potential does not affect the energies. The energies of this system are thus identical to those of the standard quantum harmonic oscillator,
$$E_n=\hbar\omega_{\rm c}\left(n+\frac{1}{2}\right) + \frac{p_z^2}{2m},\quad n\geq 0.$$
The energy does not depend on the quantum number $k_y$, so there will be a finite number of degeneracies (If the particle is placed in an unconfined space, this degeneracy will correspond to a continuous sequence of $p_y$). The value of $p_z$ is continuous if the particle is unconfined in the z-direction and discrete if the particle is bounded in the z-direction also. Each set of wave functions with the same value of $n$ is called a Landau level.

For the wave functions, recall that $\hat{p}_y$ commutes with the Hamiltonian. Then the wave function factors into a product of momentum eigenstates in the $y$ direction and harmonic oscillator eigenstates $|\phi_n\rangle$ shifted by an amount $x_0$ in the $x$ direction:
$$\Psi(x,y,z) = e^{i(k_y y+k_z z)} \phi_n(x-x_0)$$
where $k_z = p_z / \hbar$ and $\phi_n(x-x_0)$ is the n-th state for the quantum harmonic oscilator. In sum, the state of the electron is characterized by the quantum numbers, $n$, $k_y$ and $k_z$.

=== In the symmetric gauge ===
The derivation treated x and y as asymmetric. However, by the symmetry of the system, there is no physical quantity which distinguishes these coordinates. The same result could have been obtained with an appropriate interchange of x and y.

A more adequate choice of gauge, is the symmetric gauge, which refers to the choice
$$\hat{\mathbf{A}} =\frac{1}{2} \mathbf{B}\times \hat{\mathbf{r}} = \frac{1}{2}\begin{pmatrix} -By\\ Bx \\0 \end{pmatrix}.$$

In terms of dimensionless lengths and energies, the Hamiltonian can be expressed as
$$\hat{H} = \frac{1}{2} \left[\left(-i\frac{\partial}{\partial x} + \frac{y}{2}\right)^2 + \left(-i \frac{\partial}{\partial y} - \frac{x}{2}\right)^2 \right]$$

The correct units can be restored by introducing factors of $q, \hbar, \mathbf{B}$ and $m$.

Consider operators
$$\begin{align}
\hat{a} &= \frac{1}{\sqrt{2}} \left[\left(\frac{x}{2} + \frac{\partial}{\partial x}\right) -i \left(\frac{y}{2} + \frac{\partial}{\partial y}\right)\right] \\
\hat{a}^{\dagger} &= \frac{1}{\sqrt{2}} \left[\left(\frac{x}{2} - \frac{\partial}{\partial x}\right) +i \left(\frac{y}{2} - \frac{\partial}{\partial y}\right)\right] \\
\hat{b} &= \frac{1}{\sqrt{2}} \left[\left(\frac{x}{2} + \frac{\partial}{\partial x}\right) +i \left(\frac{y}{2} + \frac{\partial}{\partial y}\right)\right] \\
\hat{b}^{\dagger} &= \frac{1}{\sqrt{2}} \left[\left(\frac{x}{2} - \frac{\partial}{\partial x}\right) -i \left(\frac{y}{2} - \frac{\partial}{\partial y}\right)\right]
\end{align}$$

These operators follow certain commutation relations
$$[\hat{a}, \hat{a}^{\dagger}] = [\hat{b},\hat{b}^{\dagger}] = 1.$$

In terms of above operators the Hamiltonian can be written as
$$\hat{H} = \hbar\omega_{\rm c}\left(\hat{a}^{\dagger}\hat{a} + \frac{1}{2}\right),$$
where we reintroduced the units back.

The Landau level index $n$ is the eigenvalue of the operator $\hat{N}=\hat{a}^{\dagger}\hat{a}$.

The application of $\hat{b}^{\dagger}$ increases $m_z$ by one unit while preserving $n$, whereas $\hat{a}^{\dagger}$ application simultaneously increase $n$ and decreases $m_z$ by one unit. The analogy to quantum harmonic oscillator provides solutions
$$\hat{H} |n,m_z\rangle = E_n |n,m_z\rangle,$$
where
$$E_n = \hbar\omega_{\rm c}\left(n + \frac{1}{2}\right)$$
and
$$|n,m_z\rangle = \frac{(\hat{b}^{\dagger})^{m_z+n}}{\sqrt{(m_z+n)!}} \frac{(\hat{a}^{\dagger})^{n}}{\sqrt{n!}}|0,0\rangle.$$

One may verify that the above states correspond to choosing wavefunctions proportional to
$$\psi_{n,m_z}(x, y) = \left( \frac{\partial}{\partial w} - \frac{\bar{w}}{4} \right)^n w^{n + m_z} e^{-|w|^2 / 4}$$
where $w = x - i y$.

In particular, the lowest Landau level $n = 0$ consists of arbitrary analytic functions multiplying a Gaussian, $\psi(x,y) = f(w) e^{-|w|^2/4}$.

== Degeneracy of the Landau levels ==
=== In the Landau gauge ===
The effects of Landau levels may only be observed when the mean thermal energy kT is smaller than the energy level separation, $kT\ll\hbar\omega_c$, meaning low temperatures and strong magnetic fields.

Each Landau level is degenerate because of the second quantum number $k_y$, which can take the values
$$k_y = \frac{2 \pi N}{L_y},$$
where $N$ is an integer. The allowed values of $N$ are further restricted by the condition that the center of force of the oscillator, $x_0$, must physically lie within the system, $0\le x_0<L_x$. This gives the following range for $N$,
$$0 \leq N < \frac{m \omega_{\rm c} L_x L_y}{2\pi\hbar}.$$

For particles with charge $q=Ze$, the upper bound on $N$ can be simply written as a ratio of fluxes,
$$\frac{Z B L_x L_y}{(h/e)} = Z\frac{\Phi}{\Phi_0},$$
where $\Phi_0=h/e$ is the fundamental magnetic flux quantum and $\Phi=BA$ is the flux through the system (with area $A=L_xL_y$).

Thus, for particles with spin $S$, the maximum number $D$ of particles per Landau level is
$$D = Z (2S+1) \frac{\Phi}{\Phi_0},$$
which for electrons (where $Z= 1$ and $S=1/2$) gives $D= 2\Phi/\Phi_0$, two available states for each flux quantum that penetrates the system.

The above gives only a rough idea of the effects of finite-size geometry. Strictly speaking, using the standard solution of the harmonic oscillator is only valid for systems unbounded in the $x$-direction (infinite strips). If the size $L_x$ is finite, boundary conditions in that direction give rise to non-standard quantization conditions on the magnetic field, involving (in principle) both solutions to the Hermite equation. The filling of these levels with many electrons is still an active area of research.

In general, Landau levels are observed in electronic systems. As the magnetic field is increased, more and more electrons can fit into a given Landau level. The occupation of the highest Landau level ranges from completely full to entirely empty, leading to oscillations in various electronic properties (see De Haas–Van Alphen effect and Shubnikov–de Haas effect).

If Zeeman splitting is included, each Landau level splits into a pair, one for spin up electrons and the other for spin down electrons. Then the occupation of each spin Landau level is just the ratio of fluxes $D=\Phi/\Phi_0$. Zeeman splitting has a significant effect on the Landau levels because their energy scales are the same, $2\mu_BB=\hbar\omega_c$. However, the Fermi energy and ground state energy stay roughly the same in a system with many filled levels, since pairs of split energy levels cancel each other out when summed.

Moreover, the above derivation in the Landau gauge assumed an electron confined in the $z$-direction, which is a relevant experimental situation — found in two-dimensional electron gases, for instance. Still, this assumption is not essential for the results. If electrons are free to move along the $z$-direction, the wave function acquires an additional multiplicative term $\exp(ik_zz)$; the energy corresponding to this free motion, $(\hbar k_z)^2/(2m)$, is added to the $E$ discussed. This term then fills in the separation in energy of the different Landau levels, blurring the effect of the quantization. Nevertheless, the motion in the $x$-$y$-plane, perpendicular to the magnetic field, is still quantized.

=== In the symmetric gauge ===
Each Landau level has degenerate orbitals labeled by the quantum numbers $m_z$ in symmetric gauge. The degeneracy per unit area is the same in each Landau level.

The z component of angular momentum is
$$\hat{L}_z = -i \hbar \frac{\partial}{\partial \theta} = - \hbar (\hat{b}^{\dagger}\hat{b} - \hat{a}^{\dagger}\hat{a})$$

Exploiting the property $[\hat{H}, \hat{L}_z] = 0$ we chose eigenfunctions which diagonalize $\hat{H}$ and $\hat{L}_z$, The eigenvalue of $\hat{L}_z$ is denoted by $- m_z \hbar$, where it is clear that $m_z \ge -n$ in the $n$th Landau level. However, it may be arbitrarily large, which is necessary to obtain the infinite degeneracy (or finite degeneracy per unit area) exhibited by the system.

== Relativistic case ==
Landau levels in graphene. Charge carriers in graphene behave as relativistic massless Dirac particles.

An electron following Dirac equation under a constant magnetic field, can be analytically solved. The energies are given by
$$E_{\rm rel}=\pm \sqrt{(mc^2)^2+(c\hbar k_z)^2+2\nu \hbar\omega_{\rm c} mc^2}$$
where c is the speed of light, the sign depends on the particle-antiparticle component and ν is a non-negative integer. Due to spin, all levels are degenerate except for the ground state at ν = 0.

The massless 2D case can be simulated in single-layer materials like graphene near the Dirac cones, where the eigenergies are given by
$$E_{\rm graphene}=\pm \sqrt{2\nu\hbar eBv_{\rm F}^2 }$$
where the speed of light has to be replaced with the Fermi speed v_{F} of the material and the minus sign corresponds to electron holes.

=== Ultrarelativistic (massless) case derivation ===
For massless Dirac fermions such as in graphene, the low-energy Hamiltonian in a perpendicular magnetic filed is
$$\hat{\mathbf{H}} = v_{F} \mathbf{\sigma} \cdot (\hat{\mathbf{p}}+e\mathbf{A}),$$
where $e$ is the positive elementary charge and $\mathbf{\sigma}$denotes the Pauli matrices acting on the sublattice pseudospin. Choosing the Landau gauge as $\mathbf{A} = (0, Bx)$ and a wavefunction of the form $\Psi(x,y) = e^{ik_{y}y}\Phi(x)$, the Hamiltonian can be expressed in terms of harmonic oscillator ladder operators. Defining the magnetic length $l_{B} = \sqrt{\hbar/(eB)}$, the dimensionless coordinate $\xi = x/l_{B}+k_{y}l_{B}$ and the operators $\hat{a} = (\partial_{\xi} + \xi)/\sqrt{2}$ and $\hat{a}^{\dagger} = (-\partial_{\xi}+\xi)/\sqrt{2}$, the Hamiltonian becomes
$$\hat{\mathbf{H}} = \frac{\sqrt{2}\hbar v_{F}}{l_{B}}
\begin{pmatrix}
0 & -i\hat{a} \\
i\hat{a}^{\dagger} & 0 \end{pmatrix}.$$
Using the ladder-operator relations $\hat{a}\phi_{n} = \sqrt{n}\phi_{n-1}$ and $\hat{a}^{\dagger}\phi_{n} = \sqrt{n+1}\phi_{n+1}$, the energy eigenvalues are
$$E_{\lambda,n}=\lambda v_{F}\sqrt{2e\hbar B n}, \qquad n = 1,2,..., \qquad \lambda=\pm1,$$
together with the zero-energy level $E_{0}=0$. The corresponding normalized spinor wavefunctions, for the chosen valley and field orientation, are
$$\mathbf{\Phi}_{\lambda,n}(\xi) = \frac{1}{\sqrt{2}} \begin{pmatrix}
\phi_{n-1}(\xi)\\
i\lambda \phi_{n}(\xi)
\end{pmatrix}, \qquad
\mathbf{\Phi}_{0}(\xi) = \begin{pmatrix}
0\\
\phi_{0}(\xi)
\end{pmatrix},$$
where $\phi_{n}$ are the normalized harmonic-oscillator eigenfunctions. Unlike the equally spaced Landau levels of a conventional 2DEG, the ultrarelativistic energy levels vary as $\sqrt{nB}$, with the spectrum symmetric about the zero energy.

== Magnetic susceptibility of a Fermi gas ==
The Fermi gas (an ensemble of non-interacting fermions) is part of the basis for understanding of the thermodynamic properties of metals. In 1930 Landau derived an estimate for the magnetic susceptibility of a Fermi gas, known as Landau susceptibility, which is constant for small magnetic fields. Landau also noticed that the susceptibility oscillates with high frequency for large magnetic fields, this physical phenomenon is known as the De Haas–Van Alphen effect.

== Two-dimensional lattice ==
The tight binding energy spectrum of charged particles in a two dimensional infinite lattice is known to be self-similar and fractal, as demonstrated in Hofstadter's butterfly. For an integer ratio of the magnetic flux quantum and the magnetic flux through a lattice cell, one recovers the Landau levels for large integers.

== Integer quantum Hall effect ==
The energy spectrum of the semiconductor in a strong magnetic field forms Landau levels that can be labeled by integer indices. In addition, the Hall resistivity also exhibits discrete levels labeled by an integer ν. The fact that these two quantities are related can be shown in different ways, but most easily can be seen from Drude model: the Hall conductivity depends on the electron density n as

$\rho_{xy}=\frac{B}{n e}.$

Since the resistivity plateau is given by

$\rho_{xy}=\frac{2 \pi\hbar }{e^2}\frac{1}{\nu},$

the required density is

$n=\frac{B }{\Phi_0}\nu,$

which is exactly the density required to fill the Landau level. The gap between different Landau levels along with large degeneracy of each level renders the resistivity quantized.

== See also ==
- Laughlin wavefunction
