= Electron excitation =

Transfer of a bound electron to a more energetic state

A schematic of electron excitation, showing excitation by photon (left) and by particle collision (right)

Electron excitation is the transfer of a bound electron to a more energetic, but still bound state. This can be done by photoexcitation (PE), where the electron absorbs a photon and gains all its energy. Or it is achieved through collisional excitation (CE), where the electron receives energy from a collision with another, energetic electron. Within a semiconductor crystal lattice, thermal excitation is a process where lattice vibrations provide enough energy to transfer electrons to a higher energy band such as a more energetic sublevel or energy level. When an excited electron falls back to a state of lower energy, it undergoes electron relaxation (deexcitation). This is accompanied by the emission of a photon (radiative relaxation/spontaneous emission) or by a transfer of energy to another particle. The energy released is equal to the difference in energy levels between the electron energy states.

Excited states in nuclear, atomic, and molecule systems have distinct energy values, allowing external energy to be absorbed in the appropriate proportions.

In general, the excitation of electrons in atoms strongly varies from excitation in solids, due to the different nature of the electronic levels and the structural properties of some solids. The electronic excitation (or deexcitation) can take place by several processes such as:

- collision with more energetic electrons (Auger recombination, impact ionization, ...)
- absorption / emission of a photon,
- absorption of several photons (so called multiphoton ionization); e.g., quasi-monochromatic laser light.

There are several rules that dictate the transition of an electron to an excited state, known as selection rules. First, as previously noted, the electron must absorb an amount of energy equivalent to the energy difference between the electron's current energy level and an unoccupied, higher energy level in order to be promoted to that energy level. The next rule follows from the Frank-Condon Principle, which states that the absorption of a photon by an electron and the subsequent jump in energy levels is near-instantaneous. The atomic nucleus with which the electron is associated cannot adjust to the change in electron position on the same time scale as the electron (because nuclei are much heavier), and thus the nucleus may be brought into a vibrational state in response to the electron transition. Then, the rule is that the amount of energy absorbed by an electron may allow for the electron to be promoted from a vibrational and electronic ground state to a vibrational and electronic excited state. A third rule is the Laporte Rule, which necessitates that the two energy states between which an electron transitions must have different symmetry. A fourth rule is that when an electron undergoes a transition, the spin state of the molecule/atom that contains the electron must be conserved.

Under some circumstances, certain selection rules may be broken and excited electrons may make "forbidden" transitions. The spectral lines associated with such transitions are known as forbidden lines.

== Electron excitation in solids ==
=== Ground state preparation ===
The energy and momentum of electrons in solids can be described by introducing Bloch waves into the Schrödinger equation with applying periodic boundary conditions. Solving this eigenvalue equation, one obtains sets of solutions that are describing bands of energies that are allowed to the electrons: the electronic band structure. The latter page contains a summary of the techniques that are nowadays available for modeling the properties of solid crystals at equilibrium, i.e., when they are not illuminated by light.

=== Electron excitation by light: polariton ===
The behavior of electrons excited by photons can be described by the quasi-particle named "polariton". A number of methods exist to describe these, both using classical and quantum electrodynamics. One of the methods is to use the concept of dressed particle.

== See also ==
- Energy level
- Excimer
- Mode (electromagnetism)
- Rydberg atom
