= List of quantum-mechanical potentials =

This is a list of potential energy functions that are frequently used in quantum mechanics and have any meaning.

== One-dimensional potentials ==
- Rectangular potential barrier
- Delta potential (a.k.a. "contact potential")
- Double delta potential
- Step potential
- Periodic potential
- Barrier potential
- Gaussian potential
- Eckart potential

== Wells ==
- Quantum well
- Potential well
- Finite potential well
- Infinite potential well
- Double-well potential
- Semicircular potential well
- Circular potential well
- Spherical potential well
- Triangular potential well

== Interatomic potentials ==
- Interatomic potential
- Bond order potential
- EAM potential
- Coulomb potential
- Buckingham potential
- Lennard-Jones potential
- Morse potential
- Morse/Long-range potential
- Rosen–Morse potential
- Trigonometric Rosen–Morse potential
- Stockmayer potential
- Pöschl–Teller potential
- Axilrod–Teller potential
- Mie potential

== Oscillators ==
- Harmonic potential (harmonic oscillator)
- Morse potential (morse oscillator)
- Morse/Long-range potential (Morse/Long-range oscillator)
- Kratzer potential (Kratzer oscillator)

== Quantum Field theory ==
- Yukawa potential
- Coleman–Weinberg potential
- Uehling potential
- Woods–Saxon potential
- Cornell potential

== Miscellaneous ==
- Quantum potential
- Pseudopotential
- Superpotential
- Komar superpotential
- Kolos–Wolniewicz potential
- Wu–Sprung potential

== See also ==
- List of quantum-mechanical systems with analytical solutions
- List of integrable models
