= List of quantum-mechanical systems with analytical solutions =

Much insight in quantum mechanics can be gained from understanding the closed-form solutions to the time-dependent non-relativistic Schrödinger equation. It takes the form

$$\hat{H} \psi{\left(\mathbf{r}, t\right)} =
\left[ - \frac{\hbar^2}{2m} \nabla^2 + V{\left(\mathbf{r}\right)} \right] \psi{\left(\mathbf{r}, t\right)} = i\hbar \frac{\partial\psi{\left(\mathbf{r}, t\right)}}{\partial t},$$

where $\psi$ is the wave function of the system, $\hat{H}$ is the Hamiltonian operator, and $t$ is time. Stationary states of this equation are found by solving the time-independent Schrödinger equation,

$$\left[ - \frac{\hbar^2}{2m} \nabla^2 + V{\left(\mathbf{r}\right)} \right] \psi{\left(\mathbf{r}\right)} = E \psi {\left(\mathbf{r}\right)},$$

which is an eigenvalue equation. Very often, only numerical solutions to the Schrödinger equation can be found for a given physical system and its associated potential energy. However, there exists a subset of physical systems for which the form of the eigenfunctions and their associated energies, or eigenvalues, can be found. These quantum-mechanical systems with analytical solutions are listed below.

== Solvable systems ==
- The two-state quantum system (the simplest possible quantum system)
- The free particle
- The one-dimensional potentials
  - The particle in a ring or ring wave guide
  - The delta potential
    - The single delta potential
    - The double-well delta potential
  - The steps potentials
    - The particle in a box / infinite potential well
    - The finite potential well
    - The step potential
    - The rectangular potential barrier
  - The triangular potential
  - The quadratic potentials
    - The quantum harmonic oscillator
    - The quantum harmonic oscillator with an applied uniform field
  - The Inverse square root potential
  - The periodic potential
    - The particle in a lattice
    - The particle in a lattice of finite length
  - The Pöschl–Teller potential
  - The quantum pendulum
- The three-dimensional potentials
  - The rotating system
    - The linear rigid rotor
    - The symmetric top
  - The particle in a spherically symmetric potential
    - The hydrogen atom or hydrogen-like atom e.g. positronium
    - The hydrogen atom in a spherical cavity with Dirichlet boundary conditions
    - The Mie potential
    - The Hooke's atom
    - The Morse potential
    - The Spherium atom
- Zero range interaction in a harmonic trap
- Multistate Landau–Zener models
- The Luttinger liquid (the only exact quantum mechanical solution to a model including interparticle interactions)

== Solutions ==
| System | Hamiltonian | Energy | Remarks |
|---|---|---|---|
| Two-state quantum system | $\alpha I + \mathbf{r}\hat{\mathbf{\sigma}}\,$ | $\alpha \pm |\mathbf{r}|\,$ | |
| Free particle | $-\frac{\hbar^2\nabla^2}{2m}\,$ | $\frac{\hbar^2 \mathbf{k}^2}{2m},\,\, \mathbf{k}\in \mathbb{R}^d$ | Massive quantum free particle |
| Delta potential | $-\frac{\hbar^2}{2m}\frac{d^2}{dx^2} + \lambda \delta(x)$ | $-\frac{m \lambda^2}{2\hbar^2}$ | Bound state |
| Symmetric double-well Dirac delta potential | $-\frac{\hbar^2}{2m}\frac{d^2}{dx^2} + \lambda \left(\delta\left(x - \frac{R}{2}\right) + \delta\left(x + \frac{R}{2}\right)\right)$ | $-\frac{1}{2 R^2}\left(\lambda R + W\left(\pm \lambda R \,e^{-\lambda R}\right)\right)^2$ | $\hbar = m = 1$, W is Lambert W function, for non-symmetric potential see here |
| Particle in a box | $-\frac{\hbar^2}{2m}\frac{d^2}{dx^2} + V(x)$ $$V(x) = \begin{cases} 0, & 0 < x < L,\\ \infty, & \text{otherwise} \end{cases}$$ | $\frac{\pi^2 \hbar^2 n^2}{2 m L^2}, \,\, n = 1, 2, 3, \ldots$ | for higher dimensions see here |
| Particle in a ring | $-\frac{\hbar^2}{2mR^2}\frac{d^2}{d\theta^2}\,$ | $\frac{\hbar^2 n^2}{2 m R^2}, \,\, n = 0, \pm 1, \pm 2, \ldots$ | |
| Quantum harmonic oscillator | $-\frac{\hbar^2}{2m}\frac{d^2}{dx^2} + \frac{m \omega^2 x^2}{2}\,$ | $\hbar \omega\left(n + \frac{1}{2}\right), \,\, n = 0, 1, 2, \ldots$ | for higher dimensions see here |
| Hydrogen atom | $-\frac{\hbar^2}{2 \mu} \nabla^2 - \frac{e^2}{4 \pi \varepsilon_0 r}$ | $-\left(\frac{\mu e^4}{32 \pi^2\epsilon_0^2\hbar^2}\right)\frac{1}{n^2}, \,\, n = 1, 2, 3, \ldots$ | |

== See also ==
- List of quantum-mechanical potentials – a list of physically relevant potentials without regard to analytic solubility
- List of integrable models
- WKB approximation
- Quasi-exactly-solvable problems

== Reading materials ==
- Mattis, Daniel C. (1993). The Many-Body Problem: An Encyclopedia of Exactly Solved Models in One Dimension. World Scientific. ISBN 978-981-02-0975-9.
