= IVR (disambiguation) =

IVR is a three-letter abbreviation that may refer to:

- Accelerated idioventricular rhythm
- Interactive voice response
- International Association for Philosophy of Law and Social Philosophy
- Interventional radiology
- Inter-VSAN Routing
- Immersive virtual reality
- Integrated voltage regulator
- International vehicle registration code
- Intramolecular Vibrational Energy Redistribution
- .ivr, a video file format ("Internet Video Recording") used by recent RealPlayer programs
- Inverell Airport, IATA airport code "IVR"
- Iver railway station, Buckinghamshire, England; National Rail station code "IVR"
