= Gertrud Nordheim-Pöschl =

German-American physicist (1911–1949)

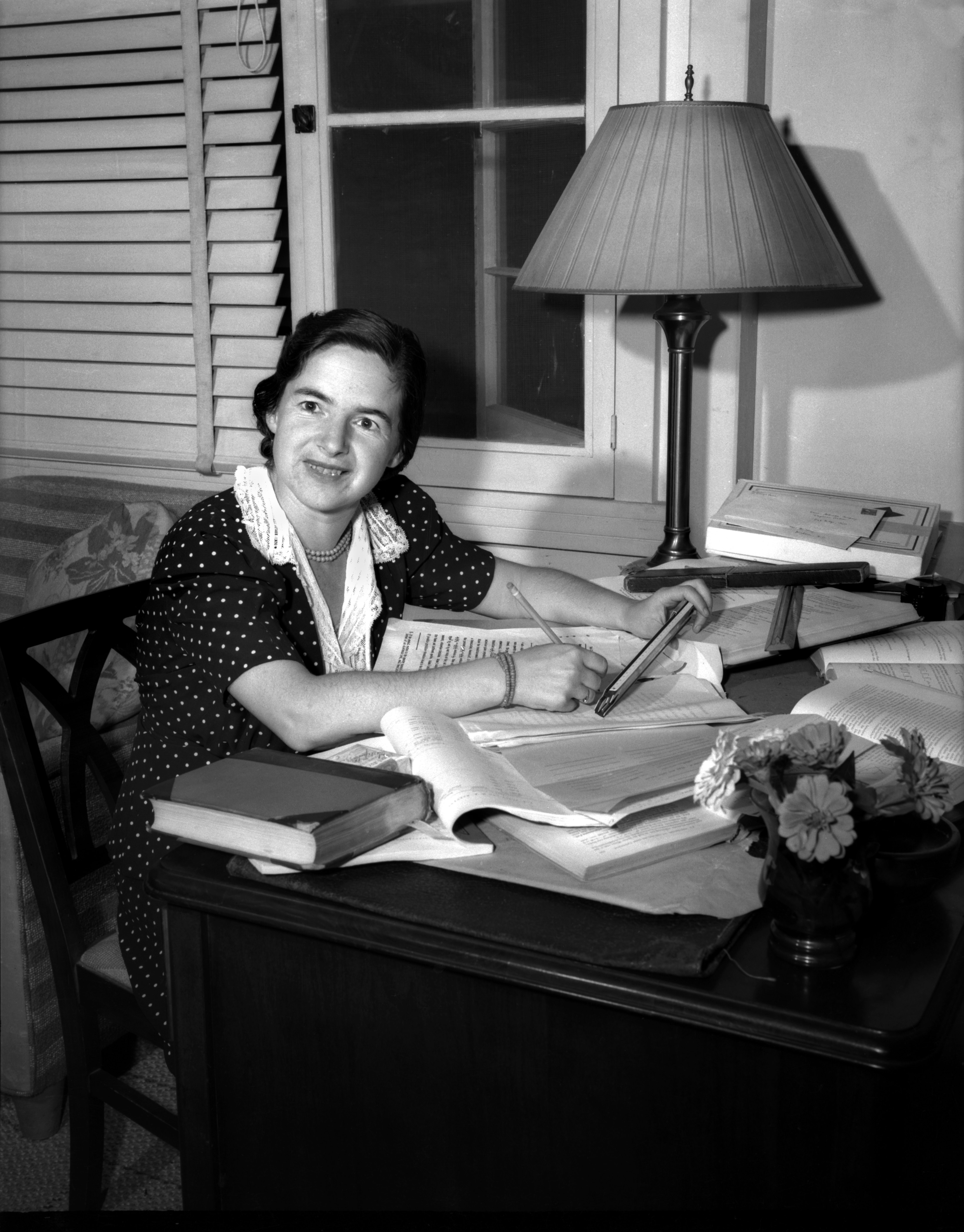
- Gertrud Nordheim at Oak Ridge Laboratory
- Born: Gertrud Pöschl; March 6, 1911; Graz, Austria
- Died: June 15, 1949 (aged 38); Germany
- Education: University of Göttingen (PhD)
- Known for: Pöschl–Teller potential
- Spouse: Lothar Nordheim
- Scientific career
- Fields: Molecular physics
- Institutions: Duke University
- Doctoral advisor: Walter Heitler

Gertrud Nordheim-Pöschl (Note: She published under the names Gertrud Pöschl, Gertrud Nordheim, Gertrud P. Nordheim and Gertrud Nordheim-Pöschl. Some sources, mistakenly cite her as Hertha Pöschl, see for example.) (March 6, 1911 – June 15, 1949) was a German-American theoretical physicist known for her work on the theory of polyatomic molecules and her collaboration with Hertha Sponer at Duke University. The Pöschl–Teller potential is named after her.

== Early life and education ==
Gertrud Pöschl was born in 1911 in Graz, Austria. She was the daughter of Martha Pöschl, née Mitzky, and mathematician Theodor Pöschl. Her younger brother Klaus Pöschl was also a mathematician. She studied theoretical physics at the University of Göttingen under Walter Heitler receiving her PhD in 1935. In March 1933, she and Edward Teller published a paper on applications of quantum mechanics to harmonic oscillators that introduced what is now known as the Pöschl–Teller potential. In 1935, she married theoretical nuclear physicist Lothar Nordheim and emigrated to America when he accepted a position at Purdue University.

== Scientific career ==
Nordheim-Pöschl's scientific career was mainly focused on the theory of the structure of polyatomic molecules and their spectra. She collaborated closely with Lothar Nordheim in her early career, publishing several joint papers him and other scientists of the day including Edward Teller and J. Robert Oppenheimer. During World War II, Nordheim-Pöschl worked at Oak Ridge National Laboratory calculating numerical tables for the melting points of ammunitions for the National Defense Research Committee with her husband, who was later named the director of the physics division.

In 1936, Lothar and Gertrud Nordheim participated in the Washington Conference on Theoretical Physics on molecular physics. Gertrud was one of the few female physicists present, the others being Maria Goeppert Mayer and Augusta H. Teller.

In 1937, after Lothar was offered a physics professorship at Duke University, Nordheim-Pöschl joined Hertha Sponer's spectroscopy laboratory where she would work the rest of her life. In an 1962 oral history, Hertha Sponer recalled how Gertrud assisted her with applying quantum mechanic to spectral analysis. In 1939 they published a paper in collaboration with Edward Teller and Alfred Lee Sklar of Catholic University on "Analysis of the Near Ultraviolet Electronic Transition of Benzene" in The Journal for Chemical Physics which helped raise the profile of Sponer's laboratory. In the following decade she published several joint papers with Sponer, including some that were published posthumously.

== Death ==
In June 1949, Gertrud and Lothar Nordehim visited Karlsruhe, Germany with their son Ricky, to see Gertrud's family for the first time since the war. Her father was then director of the Karlsruhe Institute of Technology. On June 15, 1949, Gertrud was riding a bicycle when she was struck by a car and sustained fatal injuries. Lothar was deeply affected by her death and cited it as a reason he later left Duke University for California.

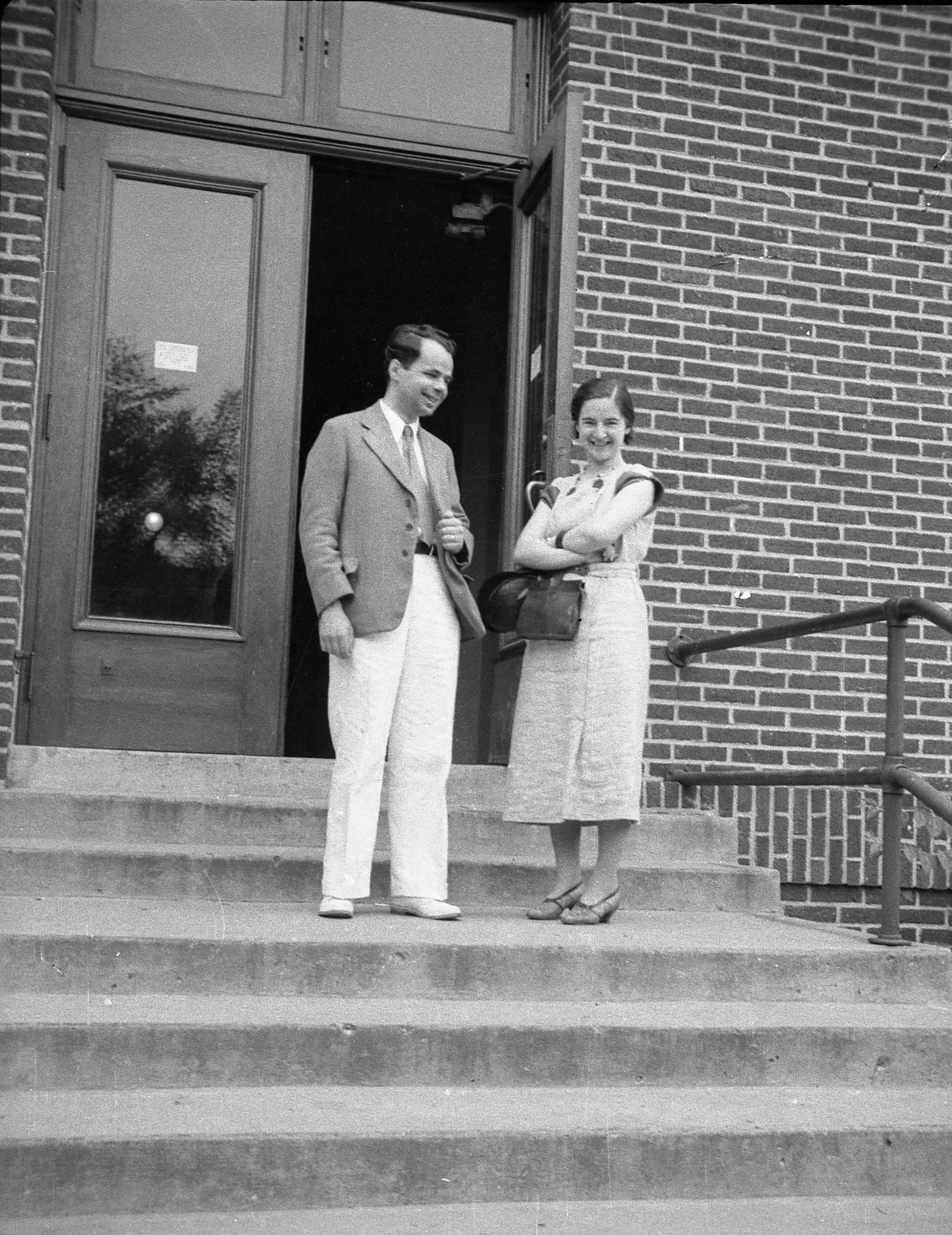
Lothar and Gertrud Nordheim

== Selected publications ==
- G. Pöschl and E. Teller, "Bemerkungen zur Quantenmechanik des anharmonischen Osziltators", Zeitschrift für Physik, Vol. 83, 143-151 (1933) https://doi.org/10.1007/BF01331132
- Nordheim-Pöschl, Gertrud. "Bahnvalenz und Richtungseigenschaften in der Theorie der chemischen Bindung. II" Annalen der Physik 418, 4 (1936) https://doi.org/10.1002/andp.19364180402
- G. Nordheim, L.W. Nordheim, J. R. Oppenheimer, and R. Serber, "The disintegration of high energy protons." Physical Review 51.12 (1937): 1037. https://doi.org/10.1103/PhysRev.51.1037
- Nordheim, Lothar W., and Gertrud Nordheim. "On the production of heavy electrons." Physical Review 54.4 (1938): 254. https://doi.org/10.1103/PhysRev.54.254
- H. Sponer, G. Nordheim, A. L. Sklar and E. Teller, “Analysis of the Near Ultraviolet Electronic Transition of Benzene,” J. Chem. Phys. 7: 207–220 (1939) https://doi.org/10.1063/1.1750419
- G. Nordheim, H. Sponer, E. Teller, “Note on the Ultraviolet Absorption Systems of Benzene Vapor,” J. Chem. Phys. 8: 455–458. (1940) https://doi.org/10.1063/1.1750688
- G. Nordheim and H. Sponer, “Determination of Chlorine Vibrations in Dichlorobenzenes from Intensities and Polarizations of their Raman Lines,” J. Chem. Phys. 11: 253–262. (1943) https://doi.org/10.1063/1.1723838
- H. Sponer and G. P. Nordheim, “Discussion of the Lowest Singlet Transition in Napthalene as a Forbidden Transition A1g—A1g and Remarks on the Higher Singlet Levels,” Disc. Far. Soc. 9: 19–26. (1950) https://doi.org/10.1039/DF9500900019
- G. P. Nordheim and H. Sponer, “On the Calculation of Electronic Levels in Pyridine and the Isomeric Picolines,” J. Chem. Phys. 20: 285–287. (1952) https://doi.org/10.1063/1.1700393
