= Stephen D. Hursting =

Stephen D. Hursting is an American scientist and current professor at the University of North Carolina at Chapel Hill. He is the former Margaret McKean Love Chair in Nutrition, Cellular, and Molecular Sciences at the University of Texas at Austin.
