= Epstein profile =

The Epstein profile, introduced by Paul Sophus Epstein in 1930, is an exactly solvable mathematical model for the vertical variation of the refractive index in a horizontally homogeneous, vertically stratified medium. In quantum mechanics, it is better known as the Eckart potential or the hyperbolic Rosen–Morse potential.

The Epstein layer is a transition zone described by this profile; typically it involves an absorbing medium.

== Definition and alternate names ==
Let z be the coordinate normal to the layers and let $\varepsilon(z)$ denote the relative permittivity — equivalently the squared refractive index, or in acoustics the squared inverse sound speed. With the dimensionless depth

$$\zeta = z/L,$$

Epstein's profile reads

$$\varepsilon(z) = \varepsilon_1
+ (\varepsilon_2-\varepsilon_1)\,\frac{e^{\zeta}}{1+e^{\zeta}}
+ \varepsilon_3\,\frac{e^{\zeta}}{\left(1+e^{\zeta}\right)^2},$$

or equivalently

$$\varepsilon(z) = \frac{\varepsilon_1+\varepsilon_2}{2}
+ \frac{\varepsilon_2-\varepsilon_1}{2}\,\tanh\frac{\zeta}{2}
+ \frac{\varepsilon_3}{4}\,\operatorname{sech}^2\frac{\zeta}{2}.$$

The four parameters have a direct meaning: $\varepsilon_1$ and $\varepsilon_2$ are the bulk values below and above the transition layer; $\varepsilon_3$ adds a symmetric bump or dip centred on $z=0$; and L sets the thickness of the transition region. Epstein measured the thickness by the dimensionless number

$$s = kL = 2\pi L/\lambda ,$$

with $k=2\pi/\lambda$ the vacuum wavenumber, so that s is the layer thickness in units of $\lambda/2\pi$.

The profile is monotonic if and only if $|\varepsilon_3| \le |\varepsilon_2-\varepsilon_1|$; otherwise $\varepsilon(z)$ overshoots and passes through an interior maximum or minimum whose value can be adjusted at will through $\varepsilon_3$. Epstein regarded this four-parameter family as "general enough" to approximate essentially any transition occurring in applications while retaining "the advantage of mathematical elegance and rigor".

In quantum mechanics, the very same potential has been introduced, slightly before Epstein, by Carl Eckart; it is referred to as the Eckart potential or the hyperbolic Rosen–Morse potential (1932), not to be confused with the trigonometric Rosen–Morse potential.

Two special cases carry their own names. The Epstein transition layer with $\varepsilon_3=0$ is a monotonic tanh step from $\varepsilon_1$ to $\varepsilon_2$. This is the smooth counterpart of a sharp Fresnel interface.

The symmetric Epstein layer with $\varepsilon_2=\varepsilon_1$ is a $\operatorname{sech}^2$ bump or dip superimposed on a homogeneous background. In quantum mechanics, it is known as the Pöschl–Teller potential.

== Exact solution ==
=== Reduction to the hypergeometric equation ===
Epstein starts from the scalar wave equation $\Delta\phi + k^2\varepsilon\phi = 0$. For electromagnetic waves this scalar form is exact only in TE (s-polarized) geometry, where the electric vector lies in the plane of the layers. The TM (p-polarized) case carries an extra term $\varepsilon'/\varepsilon$ and is not reducible to hypergeometric form for the Epstein profile, although Epstein expected the results to be qualitatively the same. For quantum particles and for acoustic waves in a medium of constant density the scalar equation is exact.

Separating the coordinate x parallel to the layers by the ansatz $\phi = e^{ikpx}\psi(z)$, where $p=\sqrt{\varepsilon_1}\sin\theta_1$ is the Snell invariant, leaves the one-dimensional equation

$$\frac{d^2\psi}{dz^2}
+ k^2\bigl(\varepsilon(z)-p^2\bigr)\psi = 0 .$$

Read as a stationary Schrödinger equation, this is the same problem with $\varepsilon$ in the role of a negative potential, which is why the profile recurs in quantum mechanics under the names given above.

The substitution $u=e^{\zeta}$ maps the equation into the hypergeometric equation, whose monodromy group — the "circuit relations" connecting the solutions at $z\to-\infty$ with those at $z\to+\infty$ — is classically known. The reflection coefficient is a ratio of the coefficients of that connection.

=== Reflection coefficient ===
Introducing

$$a = is\,q_1,\qquad b = is\,q_2,\qquad
d = \tfrac12 - \sqrt{\tfrac14+s^2\varepsilon_3},\qquad
q_j = \sqrt{\varepsilon_j-p^2},$$

where $k q_j$ is the wavenumber component normal to the layers in medium j, the amplitude reflection coefficient of a wave incident from the region $z\to-\infty$ is

$$R = \frac{\Gamma(2a)\,\Gamma(d-a-b)\,\Gamma(1-d-a-b)}
{\Gamma(-2a)\,\Gamma(d+a-b)\,\Gamma(1-d+a-b)} .$$

The expression is invariant under $d\to 1-d$, so the choice of branch for the square root in d is immaterial.

For a non-absorbing layer in which the wave propagates on both sides, $q_1$ and $q_2$ are real, so that a and b are purely imaginary, $a=ia'$ and $b=ib'$ with

$$a' = s\,q_1,\qquad b' = s\,q_2,$$

each being L times the corresponding normal wavenumber, and d is real. Using $\Gamma(x)\Gamma(1-x)=\pi/\sin\pi x$, the reflectance collapses to the compact result

$$|R|^2 = \frac{\sin^2\pi d + \sinh^2\pi(a'-b')}
{\sin^2\pi d + \sinh^2\pi(a'+b')} .$$

If $\tfrac14+s^2\varepsilon_3<0$, then $d=\tfrac12-id'$, and $\sin^2\pi d$ is to be replaced by $\cosh^2\pi d'$.

Angle of incidence and wavelength enter only through $a'$, $b'$ and d. The entire angular and spectral dependence of the reflectivity is thus available in closed form, which makes the Epstein profile a standard test case for approximate methods such as the WKB approximation and the Born approximation.

=== Epstein transition layer ===
For $\varepsilon_3=0$ one has $d=0$ and

$$|R|^2 = \frac{\sinh^2\pi(a'-b')}{\sinh^2\pi(a'+b')},\qquad
1-|R|^2 = \frac{\sinh 2\pi a'\,\sinh 2\pi b'}
{\sinh^2\pi(a'+b')} .$$

Three limits illuminate the physics.

Thin layer. For $s\to0$ the hyperbolic sines may be replaced by their arguments, and one recovers the Fresnel amplitude of a sharp interface, $|R| = |q_1-q_2|/(q_1+q_2)$. A transition much thinner than $\lambda/2\pi$ is therefore optically indistinguishable from a discontinuity. The same limit holds for the general profile, because $d$ is then of order $s^2$, so that $\sin^2\pi d$ is of fourth order in s and negligible beside the second-order $\sinh^2$ terms.

Thick layer. For large s, $|R| \simeq \exp\bigl(-2\pi\min(a',b')\bigr) = \exp\bigl(-4\pi^2 L\,\min(q_1,q_2)/\lambda\bigr)$. Reflection is suppressed exponentially as soon as the transition extends over more than a wavelength. This is the quantitative form of the familiar rule that gradual index changes do not reflect, and it is the principle exploited in graded-index antireflection coatings and rugate filters.

Total reflection. If $\varepsilon_2<p^2$, then b becomes real, numerator and denominator of R turn into complex conjugates, and $|R|=1$ exactly. A continuous layer therefore obeys the same condition for total internal reflection as a sharp interface, however thick the transition. Together these results establish Epstein's conclusion: appreciable reflection from a smooth layer occurs only near the condition of total reflection, so that outside that regime the geometrical-optics treatment of ionospheric ray paths is justified.

=== Symmetric Epstein layer ===
For $\varepsilon_2=\varepsilon_1$ one has $a=b$ and

$$|R|^2 = \frac{\sin^2\pi d}
{\sin^2\pi d + \sinh^2 2\pi a'} .$$

The reflectance vanishes identically — at all angles of incidence — whenever d is an integer, that is whenever

$$s^2\varepsilon_3 = n(n+1),\qquad n = 0,1,2,\dots$$

Since $n(n+1)\ge 0$, this requires a bump ($\varepsilon_3>0$) and never occurs for a dip. Between the zeros the reflectance oscillates, which Epstein described as the layer showing "the colors of thin or of thick plates".

The symmetric Epstein layer is therefore a family of reflectionless profiles. Its quantum-mechanical counterpart is the classical result that the potential well $V(x) = -\hbar^2 n(n+1)/(2mw^2)\,\operatorname{sech}^2(x/w)$ transmits particles of every energy without reflection. Reflectionless $\operatorname{sech}^2$ profiles occupy a distinguished place in mathematical physics: they are the one-soliton potentials of the Korteweg–De Vries equation, the simplest output of the inverse scattering transform, and a standard example of a Darboux transformation in supersymmetric quantum mechanics, in whose classification the whole Epstein family is shape-invariant.

=== Absorbing layers ===
Epstein's own question concerned a conducting layer. He therefore writes $\varepsilon_2=\kappa_2+i\Sigma_2$ and $\varepsilon_3=\kappa_3+i\Sigma_3$, "where $\kappa$ measures the refractive power and $\Sigma$ the conductive power of the medium", while $\varepsilon_1$ stays real because the wave originates in a region free of conduction. The gamma-function formula for R remains valid, but Epstein declined to discuss the general case, which he judged "too cumbersome", and evaluated instead the two special cases above, asymptotically for large s by Stirling's approximation.

Two regimes emerge:

Weak conductivity. The transparent results are recovered continuously: instead of total reflection one obtains $|R|$ slightly below unity, and away from the total-reflection condition the reflectance stays exponentially small.

Strong conductivity. The reflectance tends to $|R| = \exp(-\pi a')$, again exponentially small unless the incidence is grazing or the layer is thinner than a wavelength.

The second result looks paradoxical, since strong conduction is usually associated with high reflectivity, as in metals. Epstein resolved the paradox by noting that in a continuous medium the reflected wave is generated at all depths of the transition layer, and that the large absorption prevents it from re-emerging with appreciable intensity. His overall conclusion was that in radio propagation "if rays are reflected at all, their path can be computed neglecting conductivity, as if the medium were transparent" — the justification he had set out to obtain for the geometrical-optics analysis of his preceding paper.

== Applications ==
=== Ionospheric physics ===
The Epstein layer entered ionospheric physics through its originator's motivation and through the dissertation of Karl Rawer, who used it to compute partial reflection and the apparent (virtual) height of ionospheric layers. In present-day empirical modelling the name denotes above all the shape function: electron-density profiles are synthesized from superposed symmetric Epstein layers, one per ionospheric region, each described by a peak density, a peak height and a thickness parameter, connected where necessary by Epstein step functions. This construction underlies the bottomside and topside profiles of the International Reference Ionosphere and of the related NeQuick model. The attraction of the construction, as against a piecewise assembly of Chapman layers or of constant-gradient segments, is that a sum of Epstein terms stays analytic and differentiable everywhere, so that the unphysically sharp transitions between altitude regimes disappear on their own.

=== Acoustics and geophysics ===
In underwater acoustics and in seismology the Epstein layer serves as the canonical analytic model of a transition in sound speed — a thermocline, a sediment layer, or a velocity gradient between two half-spaces — and as the benchmark against which numerical propagation codes and ray-theoretical approximations are tested. Note that $\varepsilon$ corresponds to the squared inverse sound speed, so that an Epstein layer in $1/c^2$ is not an Epstein layer in $c$.

=== Optics and reflectometry ===
Graded interfaces occur wherever two materials interdiffuse or a surface is rough on a scale small compared with the wavelength. Averaging a sharp interface over a Gaussian distribution of heights yields an error-function profile, for which no exact solution of the wave equation is known, whereas the tanh profile has a closely similar shape and is exactly solvable. Expanding the exact result for a thin transition layer gives

$$|R| \simeq |R_\text{F}|\,\exp\bigl(-2k_{z1}k_{z2}\sigma^2\bigr),
\qquad \sigma = \pi L/\sqrt3,\qquad k_{zj} = k q_j,$$

which is the Névot–Croce attenuation factor of grazing-incidence reflectometry. Here $\sigma$ is exactly the rms width of $d\varepsilon/dz$. Since that factor depends on the interface only through its second moment, the tanh and error-function profiles agree to leading order whenever their widths are matched. The Epstein layer therefore serves as the exactly solvable reference against which the Névot–Croce approximation, and graded-interface models in X-ray and neutron reflectometry generally, can be tested.

== Generalizations ==
Burman and Gould treated a generalized Epstein profile with an additional parameter and obtained the reflection and transmission coefficients in terms of hypergeometric functions of one and, in the general case, two variables. Sluijter and Weenink extended the model to a magnetized plasma, an Epstein density profile crossed by an inhomogeneous magnetic field. More generally, Epstein-type profiles are a standard ingredient of exactly solvable models in plasma physics.

== History ==
Epstein's 1930 paper was the second of a pair. In the first he had shown, by generalized geometrical optics, that conductivity distorts ray paths only negligibly unless absorption is strong over one wavelength. Geometrical optics, however, says nothing about the reflected wave, and it was to close this gap that he sought an exactly solvable profile. He chose the hypergeometric equation because its monodromy group was the only one completely known, and then constructed the most general dielectric profile that leads to it.

Epstein reported that he had used a special case of the theory in his lectures on differential equations since 1919, as a physical illustration of analytic continuation — the law of reflection, he wrote, furnishes "a physical visualization of the rather abstract concept of analytical continuation" — demonstrating it by Wiener's experiment on light propagating through a layer of water above one of glycerine. He credited H. P. Robertson with working out another special case.

In 1933, physicists Gertrud Pöschl and Edward Teller analysed the symmetric case as an anharmonic-oscillator model. Rawer's 1939 dissertation work brought the profile into ionospheric practice, and the reviews in the monographs of Brekhovskikh and Budden established it as a textbook model.
