= List of integrable models =

This is a list of integrable models as well as classes of integrable models in physics.

== Integrable models in 1+1 dimensions ==
In classical and quantum field theory:

- free boson
- free fermion
- sine-Gordon model
- Thirring model
- sinh-Gordon model
- Liouville field theory
- Bullough–Dodd model
- Dym equation
- Calogero–Degasperis–Fokas equation
- Camassa–Holm equation
- Drinfeld–Sokolov–Wilson equation
- Benjamin–Ono equation
- SS model
- sausage model
- Toda field theories
- O(N)-symmetric non-linear sigma models
- Ernst equation
- massless Schwinger model
- supersymmetric sine-Gordon model
- supersymmetric sinh-Gordon model
- conformal minimal models
- critical Ising model
- tricritical Ising model
- 3-state Potts model
- various perturbations of conformal minimal models
- superconformal minimal models
- Wess–Zumino–Witten model
- Nonlinear Schroedinger equation
- Korteweg–de Vries equation
- modified Korteweg–de Vries equation
- Gardner equation
- Gibbons–Tsarev equation
- Hunter–Saxton equation
- Kaup–Kupershmidt equation
- XXX spin chain
- XXZ spin chain
- XYZ spin chain
- 6-vertex model
- 8-vertex model
- Kondo Model
- Anderson impurity model
- Chiral Gross–Neveu model

== Integrable models in 2+1 dimensions ==
- Ishimori equation
- Kadomtsev–Petviashvili equation
- Landau–Lifshitz–Gilbert equation
- Novikov–Veselov equation

== Integrable models in 3+1 dimensions ==
- Self-dual Yang–Mills equations
- Systems with contact Lax pairs

== In quantum mechanics ==
- harmonic oscillator
- hydrogen atom
- Hooke's atom (Hookium)
- Ruijsenaars–Schneider models
- Calogero–Moser models
- Inverse square root potential
- Lambert-W step-potential
- Multistate Landau–Zener Models

== See also ==
- List of quantum-mechanical systems with analytical solutions
- List of some well-known classical integrable systems
