= Bullough–Dodd model =

Integrable 1+1 dimensional quantum field theory

The Bullough–Dodd model is an integrable model in 1+1-dimensional quantum field theory introduced by Robin Bullough and Roger Dodd. Its Lagrangian density is

$$\mathcal{L}=\frac{1}{2}(\partial_\mu\varphi)^2-\frac{m_0^2}{6g^2}(2e^{g\varphi}
+e^{-2g\varphi})$$

where $m_0\,$ is a mass parameter, $g\,$ is the coupling constant and $\varphi\,$ is a real scalar field.

The Bullough–Dodd model belongs to the class of affine Toda field theories.

The spectrum of the model consists of a single massive particle.

== See also ==
- List of integrable models
