= Molecular physics =

Study of the physical and chemical properties of molecules

A thermally excited segment of protein alpha helix. In addition to electronic quantum states, molecules have internal degrees of freedom corresponding to rotational and vibrational motion. At appreciable temperatures, many of these new motional modes are excited, resulting in constant motion as seen above.

Molecular physics is the study of the physical properties of molecules and molecular dynamics. The field overlaps significantly with physical chemistry, chemical physics, and quantum chemistry. It is often considered as a sub-field of atomic, molecular, and optical physics. Research groups studying molecular physics are typically designated as one of these other fields. Molecular physics addresses phenomena due to both molecular structure and individual atomic processes within molecules. Like atomic physics, it relies on a combination of classical and quantum mechanics to describe interactions between electromagnetic radiation and matter. Experiments in the field often rely heavily on techniques borrowed from atomic physics, such as spectroscopy and scattering.

== Molecular structure ==
In a molecule, both the electrons and nuclei experience similar-scale forces from the Coulomb interaction. However, the nuclei remain at nearly fixed locations in the molecule while the electrons move significantly. This picture of a molecule is based on the idea that nucleons are much heavier than electrons, so will move much less in response to the same force. Neutron scattering experiments on molecules have been used to verify this description.

=== Molecular energy levels and spectra ===
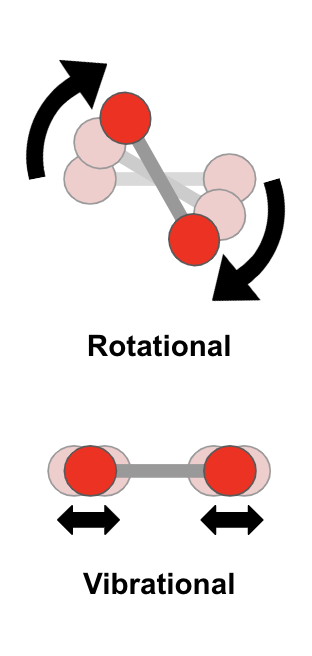
Motion associated with rotational and vibrational energy levels within a molecule. Different rotational and vibrational levels correspond to different rates of rotation or oscillation. The example shown here is a simple diatomic molecule, but the principle is similar for larger and more complicated structures.

When atoms join into molecules, their inner electrons remain bound to their original nucleus while the outer valence electrons are distributed around the molecule. The charge distribution of these valence electrons determines the electronic energy level of a molecule, and can be described by molecular orbital theory, which closely follows the atomic orbital theory used for single atoms. Assuming that the momenta of the electrons are on the order of ħ/a (where ħ is the reduced Planck constant and a is the average internuclear distance within a molecule, ~ 1 Å), the magnitude of the energy spacing for electronic states can be estimated at a few electron volts. This is the case for most low-lying molecular energy states, and corresponds to transitions in the visible and ultraviolet regions of the electromagnetic spectrum.

In addition to the electronic energy levels shared with atoms, molecules have additional quantized energy levels corresponding to vibrational and rotational states. Vibrational energy levels refer to motion of the nuclei about their equilibrium positions in the molecule. The approximate energy spacing of these levels can be estimated by treating each nucleus as a quantum harmonic oscillator in the potential produced by the molecule, and comparing its associated frequency to that of an electron experiencing the same potential. The result is an energy spacing about 100× smaller than that for electronic levels. In agreement with this estimate, vibrational spectra show transitions in the near infrared (about 1–5 μm). Finally, rotational energy states describe semi-rigid rotation of the entire molecule and produce transition wavelengths in the far infrared and microwave regions (about 100-10,000 μm in wavelength). These are the smallest energy spacings, and their size can be understood by comparing the energy of a diatomic molecule with internuclear spacing ~ 1 Å to the energy of a valence electron (estimated above as ~ ħ/a).

Actual molecular spectra also show transitions which simultaneously couple electronic, vibrational, and rotational states. For example, transitions involving both rotational and vibrational states are often referred to as rotational-vibrational or rovibrational transitions. Vibronic transitions combine electronic and vibrational transitions, and rovibronic transitions combine electronic, rotational, and vibrational transitions. Due to the very different frequencies associated with each type of transition, the wavelengths associated with these mixed transitions vary across the electromagnetic spectrum.

== Experiments ==
In general, the goals of molecular physics experiments are to characterize shape and size, electric and magnetic properties, internal energy levels, and ionization and dissociation energies for molecules. In terms of shape and size, rotational spectra and vibrational spectra allow for the determination of molecular moments of inertia, which allows for calculations of internuclear distances in molecules. X-ray diffraction allows determination of internuclear spacing directly, especially for molecules containing heavy elements. All branches of spectroscopy contribute to determination of molecular energy levels due to the wide range of applicable energies (ultraviolet to microwave regimes).

=== Current research ===
Within atomic, molecular, and optical physics, there are numerous studies using molecules to verify fundamental constants and probe for physics beyond the Standard Model. Certain molecular structures are predicted to be sensitive to new physics phenomena, such as parity and time-reversal violation. Molecules are also considered a potential future platform for trapped ion quantum computing, as their more complex energy level structure could facilitate higher efficiency encoding of quantum information than individual atoms. From a chemical physics perspective, intramolecular vibrational energy redistribution experiments use vibrational spectra to determine how energy is redistributed between different quantum states of a vibrationally excited molecule.

== See also ==
- Born–Oppenheimer approximation
- Electrostatic deflection (molecular physics/nanotechnology)
- Molecular energy state
- Molecular modeling
- Rigid rotor
- Spectroscopy
- Physical chemistry
- Chemical Physics
- Quantum Chemistry

== Sources ==
- ATOMIC, MOLECULAR AND OPTICAL PHYSICS: NEW RESEARCH by L.T. Chen; Nova Science Publishers, Inc. New York
