= Spherium =

The "spherium" model consists of two electrons trapped on the surface of a sphere of radius $R$. It has been used by Berry and collaborators to understand both weakly and strongly correlated systems and to suggest an "alternating" version of Hund's rule. Seidl studies this system in the context of density functional theory (DFT) to develop new correlation functionals within the adiabatic connection.

== Definition and solution ==
The electronic Hamiltonian in atomic units is

$$\hat{H} = - \frac{\nabla_1^2}{2} - \frac{\nabla_2^2}{2} + \frac{1}{u}$$

where $u$ is the interelectronic distance. For the singlet S states, it can be then shown that the wave function $S(u)$ satisfies the Schrödinger equation

$$\left( \frac{u^2}{4R^2} - 1 \right) \frac{d^2S(u)}{du^2} + \left(\frac{3u}{4R^2} - \frac{1}{u} \right) \frac{dS(u)}{du} + \frac{1}{u} S(u)= E S(u)$$

By introducing the dimensionless variable $x = u/2R$, this becomes a Heun equation with singular points at $x = -1, 0, +1$. Based on the known solutions of the Heun equation, we seek wave functions of the form

$$S(u) = \sum_{k=0}^\infty s_k\,u^k$$

and substitution into the previous equation yields the recurrence relation

$$s_{k+2} = \frac{ s_{k+1} + \left[ k(k+2) \frac{1}{4R^2} - E \right] s_k }{(k+2)^2}$$

with the starting values $s_0 = s_1 = 1$. Thus, the Kato cusp condition is

$$\frac{S'(0)}{S(0)} = 1$$.

The wave function reduces to the polynomial

$$S_{n,m}(u) = \sum_{k=0}^n s_k\,u^k$$

(where $m$ the number of roots between $0$ and $2R$) if, and only if, $s_{n+1} = s_{n+2} = 0$. Thus, the energy $E_{n,m}$ is a root of the polynomial equation $s_{n+1} = 0$ (where $\deg s_{n+1} = \lfloor (n+1)/2 \rfloor$) and the corresponding radius $R_{n,m}$ is found from the previous equation which yields

$$R_{n,m}^2 E_{n,m} = \frac{n}{2}\left(\frac{n}{2}+1\right)$$

$S_{n,m}(u)$ is the exact wave function of the $m$-th excited state of singlet S symmetry for the radius $R_{n,m}$.

We know from the work of Loos and Gill that the HF energy of the lowest singlet S state is $E_{\rm HF} = 1/R$. It follows that the exact correlation energy for $R = \sqrt{3}/2$ is $E_{\rm corr} = 1-2/\sqrt{3} \approx -0.1547$ which is much larger than the limiting correlation energies of the helium-like ions ($-0.0467$) or Hooke's atoms ($-0.0497$). This confirms the view that electron correlation on the surface of a sphere is qualitatively different from that in three-dimensional physical space.

== Spherium on a 3-sphere ==
Loos and Gill considered the case of two electrons confined to a 3-sphere repelling Coulombically. They report a ground state energy of ($-.0476$).

== See also ==
- List of quantum-mechanical systems with analytical solutions
