= Quasi-exact solvability =

A linear differential operator L is called quasi-exactly-solvable (QES) if it has a finite-dimensional invariant subspace of functions $\{\mathcal{V}\}_n$ such that $L: \{\mathcal{V}\}_n \rightarrow \{\mathcal{V}\}_n,$ where n is a dimension of $\{\mathcal{V}\}_n$. There are two important cases:

1. $\{\mathcal{V}\}_n$ is the space of multivariate polynomials of degree not higher than some integer number; and
2. $\{\mathcal{V}\}_n$ is a subspace of a Hilbert space. Sometimes, the functional space $\{\mathcal{V}\}_n$ is isomorphic to the finite-dimensional representation space of a Lie algebra g of first-order differential operators. In this case, the operator L is called a g-Lie-algebraic Quasi-Exactly-Solvable operator. Usually, one can indicate basis where L has block-triangular form. If the operator L is of the second order and has the form of the Schrödinger operator, it is called a Quasi-Exactly-Solvable Schrödinger operator.

The most studied cases are one-dimensional $sl(2)$-Lie-algebraic quasi-exactly-solvable (Schrödinger) operators. The best known example is the sextic QES anharmonic oscillator with the Hamiltonian

$\{\mathcal{H}\} = -\frac{d^2}{dx^2} + a^2 x^6 + 2abx^4 + [b^2 - (4 n + 3 + 2p) a] x^2, \ a \geq 0\ ,\ n\in\mathbb{N}\ ,\ p=\{0,1\},$

where (n+1) eigenstates of positive (negative) parity can be found algebraically. Their eigenfunctions are of the form

$\Psi (x)\ =\ x^p P_n(x^2) e^{-\frac{a x^4}{4} - \frac{b x^2}{2} } \ ,$

where $P_n(x^2)$ is a polynomial of degree n and (energies) eigenvalues are roots of an algebraic equation of degree (n+1). In general, twelve families of one-dimensional QES problems are known, two of them characterized by elliptic potentials.
