= Quantum pendulum =

The quantum pendulum is a theoretical model and experimental system that studies how a pendulum behaves under quantum mechanics. It is fundamental in understanding hindered internal rotations in chemistry, quantum features of scattering atoms, as well as numerous other quantum phenomena. Though a pendulum not subject to the small-angle approximation has an inherent nonlinearity, the Schrödinger equation for the quantized system can be solved relatively easily.

== Schrödinger equation ==
Using Lagrangian mechanics, one can develop a Hamiltonian for the system. A simple pendulum has one generalized coordinate (the angular displacement $\phi$) and two constraints (the length of the string and the plane of motion). The kinetic and potential energies of the system can be found to be

$$T = \frac{1}{2} m l^2 \dot{\phi}^2,$$
$$U = mgl (1 - \cos\phi).$$

This results in the Hamiltonian

$$\hat{H} = \frac{\hat{p}^2}{2 m l^2} + mgl (1 - \cos\phi).$$

The time-dependent Schrödinger equation for the system is

$$i \hbar \frac{d\Psi}{dt} = -\frac{\hbar^2}{2 m l^2} \frac{d^2 \Psi}{d \phi^2} + mgl (1 - \cos\phi) \Psi.$$

One must solve the time-independent Schrödinger equation to find the energy levels and corresponding eigenstates. This is best accomplished by changing the independent variable as follows:

$$\eta = \phi + \pi,$$
$$\Psi = \psi e^{-iEt/\hbar},$$
$$E \psi = -\frac{\hbar^2}{2 m l^2} \frac{d^2 \psi}{d \eta^2} + mgl (1 + \cos\eta) \psi.$$

This is simply Mathieu's differential equation

$$\frac{d^2 \psi}{d \eta^2} + \left(\frac{2 m E l^2}{\hbar^2} - \frac{2 m^2 g l^3}{\hbar^2} - \frac{2 m^2 g l^3}{\hbar^2} \cos\eta\right) \psi = 0,$$

whose solutions are Mathieu functions.

== Solutions ==
=== Energies ===
Given $q$, for countably many special values of $a$, called characteristic values, the Mathieu equation admits solutions that are periodic with period $2\pi$. The characteristic values of the Mathieu cosine, sine functions respectively are written $a_n(q), b_n(q)$, where $n$ is a natural number. The periodic special cases of the Mathieu cosine and sine functions are often written $CE(n,q,x), SE(n,q,x)$ respectively, although they are traditionally given a different normalization (namely, that their $L^2$norm equals $\pi$).

The boundary conditions in the quantum pendulum imply that $a_n(q), b_n(q)$ are as follows for a given $q$:

$$\frac{d^2 \psi}{d \eta^2} + \left(\frac{2 m E l^2}{\hbar^2} - \frac{2 m^2 g l^3}{\hbar^2} - \frac{2 m^2 g l^3}{\hbar^2} \cos\eta\right) \psi = 0,$$

$$a_n(q), b_n(q) = \frac{2 m E l^2}{\hbar^2} - \frac{2 m^2 g l^3}{\hbar^2}.$$

The energies of the system, $E = m g l + \frac{\hbar^2 a_n(q), b_n(q)}{2 m l^2}$ for even/odd solutions respectively, are quantized based on the characteristic values found by solving the Mathieu equation.

The effective potential depth can be defined as

$$q = \frac{m^2 g l^3}{\hbar^2}.$$

A deep potential yields the dynamics of a particle in an independent potential. In contrast, in a shallow potential, Bloch waves, as well as quantum tunneling, become of importance.

=== General solution ===
The general solution of the above differential equation for a given value of a and q is a set of linearly independent Mathieu cosines and Mathieu sines, which are even and odd solutions respectively. In general, the Mathieu functions are aperiodic; however, for characteristic values of $a_n(q), b_n(q)$, the Mathieu cosine and sine become periodic with a period of $2\pi$.

=== Eigenstates ===
For positive values of q, the following is true:

$$C(a_n(q), q, x) = \frac{CE(n, q, x)}{CE(n, q, 0)},$$
$$S(b_n(q), q, x) = \frac{SE(n, q, x)}{SE'(n, q, 0)}.$$

Here are the first few periodic Mathieu cosine functions for $q = 1$.

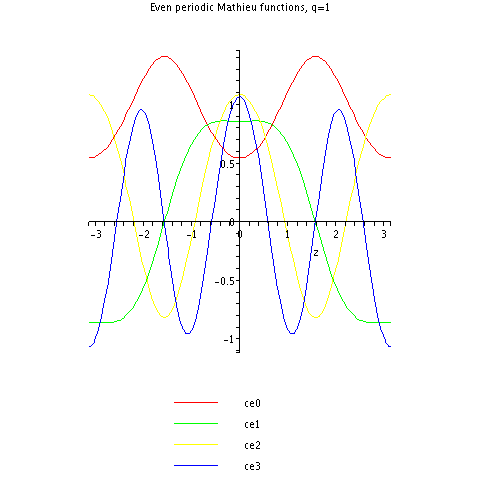

Note that, for example, $CE(1, 1, x)$ (green) resembles a cosine function, but with flatter hills and shallower valleys.

== See also ==
- Quantum harmonic oscillator

== Bibliography ==
- Bransden, B. H.; Joachain, C. J. (2000). Quantum mechanics (2nd ed.). Essex: Pearson Education. ISBN 0-582-35691-1.
- Davies, John H. (2006). The Physics of Low-Dimensional Semiconductors: An Introduction (6th reprint ed.). Cambridge University Press. ISBN 0-521-48491-X.
- Muhammad Ayub, Atom Optics Quantum Pendulum, 2011, Islamabad, Pakistan., https://arxiv.org/abs/1012.6011
