= Intramolecular vibrational energy redistribution =

Intramolecular vibrational energy redistribution (IVR) is a process in which energy is redistributed between different quantum states of a vibrationally excited molecule, which is required by successful theories explaining unimolecular reaction rates such as RRKM theory. Such theories assume a full statistical redistribution between all vibrational modes, but restricted redistribution could enable bond selective chemistry for which deposited energy must remain in a particular mode for as long as it takes for the required reaction to take place.
