= Quantum harmonic oscillator =

Quantum mechanical model

Some trajectories of a harmonic oscillator according to Newton's laws of classical mechanics (A–B), and according to the Schrödinger equation of quantum mechanics (C–H). In A–B, the particle (represented as a ball attached to a spring) oscillates back and forth. In C–H, some solutions to the Schrödinger equation are shown, where the horizontal axis is position, and the vertical axis is the real part (blue) or imaginary part (red) of the wavefunction. C, D, E, F, but not G, H, are energy eigenstates. H is a coherent state—a quantum state that approximates the classical trajectory.

The quantum harmonic oscillator is the quantum-mechanical analog of the classical harmonic oscillator. Because an arbitrary smooth potential can usually be approximated as a harmonic potential at the vicinity of a stable equilibrium point, it is one of the most important model systems in quantum mechanics. Furthermore, it is one of the few quantum-mechanical systems for which an exact, analytical solution is known.

== One-dimensional harmonic oscillator ==
=== Hamiltonian and energy eigenstates ===
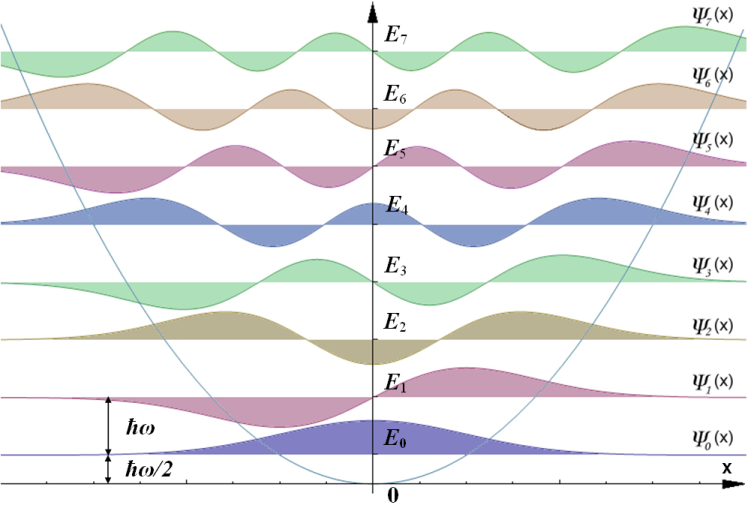
Wavefunction representations for the first eight bound eigenstates, n = 0 to 7. The horizontal axis shows the position x.

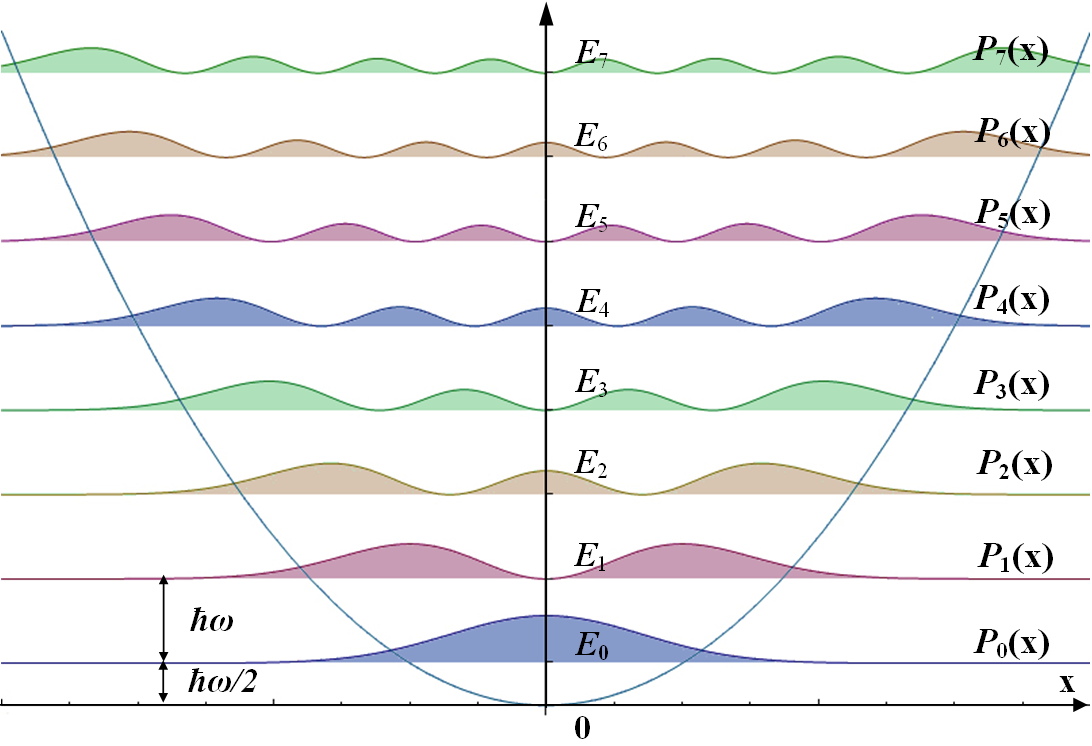
Corresponding probability densities.

The Hamiltonian of the particle is:
$$\hat H = \frac{{\hat p}^2}{2m} + \frac{1}{2} k {\hat x}^2 = \frac{{\hat p}^2}{2m} + \frac{1}{2} m \omega^2 {\hat x}^2 \, ,$$
where m is the particle's mass, k is the force constant, $\omega = \sqrt{k / m}$ is the angular frequency of the oscillator, $\hat{x}$ is the position operator (given by x in the coordinate basis), and $\hat{p}$ is the momentum operator (given by $\hat p = -i \hbar \, \partial / \partial x$ in the coordinate basis). The first term in the Hamiltonian represents the kinetic energy of the particle, and the second term represents its potential energy, as in Hooke's law.

The time-independent Schrödinger equation (TISE) is,
$$\hat H \left| \psi \right\rangle = E \left| \psi \right\rangle  ~,$$
where $E$ denotes a real number (which needs to be determined) that will specify a time-independent energy level, or eigenvalue, and the solution $| \psi \rangle$ denotes that level's energy eigenstate.

Then solve the differential equation representing this eigenvalue problem in the coordinate basis, for the wave function $\langle x | \psi \rangle = \psi (x)$, using a spectral method. It turns out that there is a family of solutions. In this basis, they amount to Hermite functions,
$$\psi_n(x) = \frac{1}{\sqrt{2^n\,n!}}  \left(\frac{m\omega}{\pi \hbar}\right)^{1/4}  e^{
- \frac{m\omega x^2}{2 \hbar}} H_n{\left(\sqrt{\frac{m\omega}{\hbar}} x \right)}, \qquad n = 0,1,2,\ldots.$$

The functions $H_n$ are the physicists' Hermite polynomials,
$$H_n(z)=(-1)^n~ e^{z^2}\frac{d^n}{dz^n}\left(e^{-z^2}\right).$$

The corresponding energy levels are
$$E_n = \hbar \omega\bigl(n + \tfrac{1}{2}\bigr).$$
The expectation values of position and momentum combined with variance of each variable can be derived from the wavefunction to understand the behavior of the energy eigenkets. They are shown to be $\langle \hat{x} \rangle = 0$ and $\langle \hat{p} \rangle = 0$ owing to the symmetry of the problem, whereas:

$$\begin{align}
\left\langle x^2 \right\rangle &= (2n+1)\frac{\hbar}{2m\omega} = \sigma_x^2 \\[1ex]
\left\langle p^2 \right\rangle &= (2n+1)\frac{m\hbar\omega}{2} = \sigma_p^2
\end{align}$$

The variance in both position and momentum are observed to increase for higher energy levels. The lowest energy level has value of $\sigma_x \sigma_p = \frac{\hbar}{2}$ which is its minimum value due to uncertainty relation and also corresponds to a Gaussian wavefunction.

This energy spectrum is noteworthy for four reasons. First, the energies are quantized, meaning that only discrete energy values (integer-plus-half multiples of ħω) are possible; this is a general feature of quantum-mechanical systems when a particle is confined. Second, these discrete energy levels are equally spaced, unlike in the Bohr model of the atom, or the particle in a box. Third, the lowest achievable energy (the energy of the n = 0 state, called the ground state) is not equal to the minimum of the potential well, but ħω/2 above it; this is called zero-point energy. Because of the zero-point energy, the position and momentum of the oscillator in the ground state are not fixed (as they would be in a classical oscillator), but have a small range of variance, in accordance with the Heisenberg uncertainty principle. Fourth, the energy levels are nondegenerate implying that every eigenvalue is associated with only one solution (state).

The ground state probability density is concentrated at the origin, which means the particle spends most of its time at the bottom of the potential well, as one would expect for a state with little energy. As the energy increases, the probability density peaks at the classical "turning points", where the state's energy coincides with the potential energy. (See the discussion below of the highly excited states.) This is consistent with the classical harmonic oscillator, in which the particle spends more of its time (and is therefore more likely to be found) near the turning points, where it is moving the slowest. The correspondence principle is thus satisfied. Moreover, special nondispersive wave packets, with minimum uncertainty, called coherent states oscillate very much like classical objects, as illustrated in the figure; they are not eigenstates of the Hamiltonian.

=== Ladder operator method ===
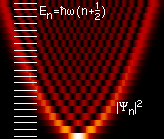
Probability densities |ψ_{n}(x)|^{2} for the bound eigenstates, beginning with the ground state (n = 0) at the bottom and increasing in energy toward the top. The horizontal axis shows the position x, and brighter colors represent higher probability densities.

The "ladder operator" method, developed by Paul Dirac, allows extraction of the energy eigenvalues without directly solving the differential equation. It is generalizable to more complicated problems, notably in quantum field theory. Following this approach, we define the operators $\hat a$ and its adjoint $\hat a^\dagger$,
$$\begin{align}
\hat a &=\sqrt{m\omega \over 2\hbar} \left(\hat x + {i \over m \omega} \hat p \right) \\
\hat a^\dagger &=\sqrt{m\omega \over 2\hbar} \left(\hat x - {i \over m \omega} \hat p \right)
\end{align}$$
Note these operators classically are exactly the generators of normalized rotation in the phase space of $x$ and $m\frac{dx}{dt}$, i.e they describe the forwards and backwards evolution in time of a classical harmonic oscillator.

These operators lead to the following representation of $\hat{x}$ and $\hat{p}$,
$$\begin{align}
\hat x &=  \sqrt{\frac{\hbar}{2 m\omega}}(\hat a^\dagger + \hat a) \\
\hat p &= i\sqrt{\frac{\hbar m \omega}{2}}(\hat a^\dagger - \hat a) ~.
\end{align}$$

The operator $\hat{a}$ is not Hermitian, since itself and its adjoint $\hat{a}^{\dagger}$ are not equal. The energy eigenstates $\left| n \right\rangle$, when operated on by these ladder operators, give
$$\begin{align}
\hat a^\dagger|n\rangle &= \sqrt{n + 1} | n + 1\rangle \\
\hat a|n\rangle &= \sqrt{n} | n - 1\rangle.
\end{align}$$

From the relations above, we can also define a number operator N, which has the following property:
$$\begin{align}
\hat N &= \hat a^\dagger \hat a \\
\hat N\left| n \right\rangle &= n\left| n \right\rangle.
\end{align}$$

The following commutators can be easily obtained by substituting the canonical commutation relation,
$$[\hat a, \hat a^\dagger] = 1,\qquad[\hat N, \hat a^\dagger] = \hat a^{\dagger},\qquad[\hat N, \hat a] = -\hat a,$$

and the Hamilton operator can be expressed as
$$\hat H = \hbar\omega\left(\hat N + \frac{1}{2}\right),$$

so the eigenstates of $\hat N$ are also the eigenstates of energy. To see that, we can apply $\hat{H}$ to a number state $|n\rangle$:

$$\hat{H} |n\rangle = \hbar \omega \left(\hat{N} + \frac{1}{2}\right) |n\rangle.$$

Using the property of the number operator $\hat{N}$:

$$\hat{N} |n\rangle = n |n\rangle,$$

we get:

$$\hat{H} |n\rangle = \hbar \omega \left(n + \frac{1}{2}\right) |n\rangle.$$

Thus, since $|n\rangle$ solves the TISE for the Hamiltonian operator $\hat{H}$, is also one of its eigenstates with the corresponding eigenvalue:

$$E_n = \hbar \omega \left(n + \frac{1}{2}\right) .$$

QED.

The commutation property yields
$$\begin{align}
\hat N\hat a^{\dagger}|n\rangle &= \left(\hat a^\dagger \hat N + [\hat N, \hat a^\dagger]\right)|n\rangle \\
&= \left(\hat a^\dagger \hat N + \hat a^\dagger\right)|n\rangle \\
&= (n + 1)\hat a^\dagger|n\rangle,
\end{align}$$

and similarly,
$$\hat N\hat a|n\rangle = (n - 1)\hat a | n \rangle.$$

This means that $\hat a$ acts on $|n\rangle$ to produce, up to a multiplicative constant, $|n-1\rangle$, and $\hat a^\dagger$ acts on $|n\rangle$ to produce $|n+1\rangle$. For this reason, $\hat a$ is called an annihilation operator ("lowering operator"), and $\hat a^\dagger$ a creation operator ("raising operator"). The two operators together are called ladder operators.

Given any energy eigenstate, we can act on it with the lowering operator, $\hat a$, to produce another eigenstate with $\hbar \omega$ less energy. By repeated application of the lowering operator, it seems that we can produce energy eigenstates down to $E = - \infty$. However, since
$$n = \langle n | \hat N | n \rangle = \langle n | \hat a^\dagger \hat a | n \rangle = \Bigl(\hat a | n \rangle \Bigr)^\dagger \hat a | n \rangle \geqslant 0,$$

the smallest eigenvalue of the number operator is 0, and
$$\hat a \left| 0 \right\rangle = 0.$$

In this case, subsequent applications of the lowering operator will just produce zero, instead of additional energy eigenstates. Furthermore, we have shown above that
$$\hat H \left|0\right\rangle = \frac{\hbar\omega}{2} \left|0\right\rangle$$

Finally, by acting on $|0\rangle$ with the raising operator and multiplying by suitable normalization factors, we can produce an infinite set of energy eigenstates
$$\left\{\left| 0 \right\rangle, \left| 1 \right\rangle, \left| 2 \right\rangle, \ldots , \left| n \right\rangle, \ldots\right\},$$

such that
$$\hat H \left| n \right\rangle = \hbar\omega \left( n + \frac{1}{2} \right) \left| n \right\rangle,$$
which matches the energy spectrum given in the preceding section.

Arbitrary eigenstates can be expressed in terms of $|0\rangle$,
$$|n\rangle = \frac{(\hat a^\dagger)^n}{\sqrt{n!}} |0\rangle.$$

Proof

$$\begin{align}
\langle n | \hat a \hat a^\dagger | n \rangle &= \langle n|\left([\hat a, \hat a^\dagger] + \hat a^\dagger \hat a\right) \left| n \right\rangle = \langle n| \left(N + 1\right) |n\rangle = n + 1 \\[1ex]
\Rightarrow \hat a^\dagger | n\rangle &= \sqrt{n + 1} | n + 1\rangle \\[1ex]
\Rightarrow|n\rangle &= \frac{1}{\sqrt{n}} \hat a^\dagger \left| n - 1 \right\rangle = \frac{1}{\sqrt{n(n - 1)}} \left(\hat a^\dagger\right)^2 \left| n - 2 \right\rangle = \cdots = \frac{1}{\sqrt{n!}} \left(\hat a^\dagger\right)^n \left|0\right\rangle.
\end{align}$$

==== Analytical questions ====
The preceding analysis is algebraic, using only the commutation relations between the raising and lowering operators. Once the algebraic analysis is complete, one should turn to analytical questions. First, one should find the ground state, that is, the solution of the equation $a\psi_0 = 0$. In the position representation, this is the first-order differential equation
$$\left(x+\frac{\hbar}{m\omega}\frac{d}{dx}\right)\psi_0 = 0,$$
whose solution is easily found to be the Gaussian (Note: The normalization constant is $C = \left(\frac{m\omega}{\pi \hbar}\right)^{{1}/{4}}$, and satisfies the normalization condition $\int_{-\infty}^{\infty}\psi_0(x)^{*}\psi_0(x)dx = 1$.)
$$\psi_0(x)=Ce^{-\frac{m\omega x^2}{2\hbar}}.$$
Conceptually, it is important that there is only one solution of this equation; if there were, say, two linearly independent ground states, we would get two independent chains of eigenvectors for the harmonic oscillator. Once the ground state is computed, one can show inductively that the excited states are Hermite polynomials times the Gaussian ground state, using the explicit form of the raising operator in the position representation. One can also prove that, as expected from the uniqueness of the ground state, the Hermite functions energy eigenstates $\psi_n$ constructed by the ladder method form a complete orthonormal set of functions.

Given that Hermite functions are either even or odd, it can be shown that the average displacement and average momentum is 0 for all states in QHO.

Explicitly connecting with the previous section, the ground state $| 0\rangle$ in the position representation is determined by $a| 0\rangle =0$,
$$\left\langle x \mid a \mid 0 \right\rangle = 0 \qquad
\Rightarrow \left(x + \frac{\hbar}{m\omega}\frac{d}{dx}\right)\left\langle x\mid 0\right\rangle = 0 \qquad
\Rightarrow$$
$$\left\langle x\mid 0\right\rangle = \left(\frac{m\omega}{\pi\hbar}\right)^\frac{1}{4} \exp\left( -\frac{m\omega}{2\hbar}x^2 \right)
= \psi_0  ~,$$
hence
$$\langle x \mid a^\dagger \mid 0 \rangle = \psi_1 (x) ~,$$
so that $\psi_1(x,t)=\langle x \mid e^{-3i\omega t/2} a^\dagger \mid 0 \rangle$, and so on.

=== Natural length and energy scales ===
The quantum harmonic oscillator possesses natural scales for length and energy, which can be used to simplify the problem. These can be found by nondimensionalization.

The result is that, if energy is measured in units of ħω and distance in units of √ħ/(mω), then the Hamiltonian simplifies to
$$H = -\frac{1}{2} {d^2 \over dx^2} +\frac{1}{2}  x^2 ,$$
while the energy eigenfunctions and eigenvalues simplify to Hermite functions and integers offset by a half,
$$\psi_n(x)= \left\langle x \mid n \right\rangle = {1 \over \sqrt{2^n n!}}~ \pi^{-1/4} \exp\left(-x^2 / 2\right)~ H_n(x),$$
$$E_n = n + \tfrac{1}{2} ~,$$
where H_{n}(x) are the Hermite polynomials.

To avoid confusion, these "natural units" will mostly not be adopted in this article. However, they frequently come in handy when performing calculations, by bypassing clutter.

For example, the fundamental solution (propagator) of H − i∂_{t}, the time-dependent Schrödinger operator for this oscillator, simply boils down to the Mehler kernel,
$$\left\langle x \right| \exp (-itH) \left| y \right\rangle \equiv K(x,y;t)= \frac{1}{\sqrt{2\pi i \sin t}} \exp \left(\frac{i}{2\sin t}\left (\left(x^2+y^2\right)\cos t - 2xy\right )\right )~,$$
where K(x,y;0) = δ(x − y). The most general solution for a given initial configuration ψ(x,0) then is simply
$$\psi(x,t)=\int dy~ K(x,y;t) \psi(y,0) \,.$$

=== Coherent states ===
Coherent state dynamics for $\alpha = \sqrt{10}$, in units of the harmonic oscillator length $x_0=\sqrt{\hbar/m\omega}$, showing the probability density $|\psi(x,t)|^2$ and the quantum phase (color).

The coherent states (also known as Glauber states) of the harmonic oscillator are special nondispersive wave packets, with minimum uncertainty σ_{x} σ_{p} = ℏ/2, whose observables' expectation values evolve like a classical system. They are eigenvectors of the annihilation operator, not the Hamiltonian, and form an overcomplete basis which consequentially lacks orthogonality.

The coherent states are indexed by $\alpha \in \mathbb{C}$ and expressed in the |n⟩ basis as

$$\begin{align}
|\alpha\rangle &= \sum_{n=0}^\infty |n\rangle \langle n | \alpha \rangle \\
&= e^{-\frac{1}{2} |\alpha|^2} \sum_{n=0}^\infty\frac{\alpha^n}{\sqrt{n!}} |n\rangle  \\
&= e^{-\frac{1}{2} |\alpha|^2} e^{\alpha a^\dagger} e^{-{\alpha^* a}} |0\rangle.
\end{align}$$

Since coherent states are not energy eigenstates, their time evolution is not a simple shift in wavefunction phase. The time-evolved states are, however, also coherent states but with phase-shifting parameter α instead: $\alpha(t) = \alpha(0) e^{-i\omega t} = \alpha_0 e^{-i\omega t}$.

$$\begin{align}
|\alpha(t)\rangle &= \sum_{n=0}^\infty e^{-i\left(n+\frac{1}{2}\right) \omega t}|n\rangle \langle n | \alpha \rangle \\
&=  e^{\frac{-i\omega t}{2}}e^{-\frac{1}{2} |\alpha|^2} \sum_{n=0}^\infty\frac{(\alpha e^{-i\omega t})^n}{\sqrt{n!}} |n\rangle \\
&= e^{-\frac{i\omega t}{2}}|\alpha e^{-i\omega t}\rangle
\end{align}$$

Because $a \left| 0 \right\rangle = 0$ and via the Kermack-McCrae identity, the last form is equivalent to a unitary displacement operator acting on the ground state: $|\alpha\rangle=e^{\alpha \hat a^\dagger - \alpha^*\hat a}|0\rangle = D(\alpha)|0\rangle$. Calculating the expectation values:

$$\begin{align}
\langle \hat{x} \rangle_{\alpha(t)} &= \sqrt{\frac{2\hbar}{m\omega}} \left|\alpha_0\right| \cos{(\omega t - \phi)} \\[1ex]
\langle \hat{p} \rangle_{\alpha(t)} &= -\sqrt{2m\hbar \omega} \left|\alpha_0\right| \sin{(\omega t - \phi)}
\end{align}$$

where $\phi$ is the phase contributed by complex α. These equations confirm the oscillating behavior of the particle.

The uncertainties calculated using the numeric method are:

$$\begin{align}
\sigma_x(t) &= \sqrt{\frac{\hbar}{2m\omega}} \\
\sigma_p(t) &= \sqrt{\frac{m\hbar\omega}{2}}
\end{align}$$

which gives $\sigma_x(t)\sigma_p(t) = \frac{\hbar}{2}$. Since the only wavefunction that can have lowest position–momentum uncertainty, $\frac{\hbar}{2}$, is a Gaussian wavefunction, and since the coherent state wavefunction has minimum position–momentum uncertainty, we note that the general Gaussian wavefunction in quantum mechanics has the form:
$$\psi_\alpha(x')= \left(\frac{m\omega}{\pi\hbar}\right)^{\frac{1}{4}} e^{\frac{i}{\hbar} \langle\hat{p}\rangle_\alpha (x' - \frac{\langle\hat{x}\rangle_\alpha}{2}) - \frac{m\omega}{2\hbar}(x' - \langle\hat{x}\rangle_\alpha)^2} .$$
Substituting the expectation values as a function of time, gives the required time varying wavefunction.

The probability of each energy eigenstates can be calculated to find the energy distribution of the wavefunction:

$$P(E_n) = \left|\langle n | \alpha \rangle\right|^2 =  \frac{e^{-|\alpha|^2}|\alpha|^{2n}}{n!}$$

which corresponds to a Poisson distribution.

=== Highly excited states ===
Wavefunction (top) and probability density (bottom) for the n = 30 excited state of the quantum harmonic oscillator. Vertical dashed lines indicate the classical turning points, while the dotted line represents the classical probability density.

When n is large, the eigenstates are localized into the classical allowed region, that is, the region in which a classical particle with energy E_{n} can move. The eigenstates are peaked near the turning points: the points at the ends of the classically allowed region where the classical particle changes direction. This phenomenon can be verified through asymptotics of the Hermite polynomials, and also through the WKB approximation.

The frequency of oscillation at x is proportional to the momentum p(x) of a classical particle of energy E_{n} and position x. Furthermore, the square of the amplitude (determining the probability density) is inversely proportional to p(x), reflecting the length of time the classical particle spends near x. The system behavior in a small neighborhood of the turning point does not have a simple classical explanation, but can be modeled using an Airy function. Using properties of the Airy function, one may estimate the probability of finding the particle outside the classically allowed region, to be approximately
$$\frac{2}{n^{1/3}3^{2/3}\Gamma^2(\tfrac{1}{3})}=\frac{1}{n^{1/3}\cdot  7.46408092658...}$$
This is also given, asymptotically, by the integral
$$\frac{1}{2\pi}\int_{0}^{\infty}e^{(2n+1)\left (x-\tfrac{1}{2}\sinh(2x)  \right )}dx ~.$$

=== Phase space solutions ===
In the phase space formulation of quantum mechanics, eigenstates of the quantum harmonic oscillator in several different representations of the quasiprobability distribution can be written in closed form. The most widely used of these is for the Wigner quasiprobability distribution.

The Wigner quasiprobability distribution for the energy eigenstate |n⟩ is, in the natural units described above,
$$F_n(x, p) = \frac{(-1)^n}{\pi \hbar} L_n{\left(2(x^2 + p^2)\right)} e^{-(x^2 + p^2)} \,,$$
where L_{n} are the Laguerre polynomials. This example illustrates how the Hermite and Laguerre polynomials are linked through the Wigner map.

Meanwhile, the Husimi Q function of the harmonic oscillator eigenstates have an even simpler form. If we work in the natural units described above, we have
$$Q_n(x,p)=\frac{(x^2+p^2)^n}{n!}\frac{e^{-(x^2+p^2)}}{\pi}$$
This claim can be verified using the Segal–Bargmann transform. Specifically, since the raising operator in the Segal–Bargmann representation is simply multiplication by $z=x+ip$ and the ground state is the constant function 1, the normalized harmonic oscillator states in this representation are simply $z^n/\sqrt{n!}$ . At this point, we can appeal to the formula for the Husimi Q function in terms of the Segal–Bargmann transform.

=== Two-dimensional harmonic oscillators ===
The two-dimensional Cartesian harmonic oscillator and the two-dimensional isotropic harmonic oscillator in cylindrical coordinates have been treated in detail in the book of Müller-Kirsten.

== N-dimensional isotropic harmonic oscillator ==
The one-dimensional harmonic oscillator is readily generalizable to N dimensions, where N = 1, 2, 3, .... In one dimension, the position of the particle was specified by a single coordinate, x. In N dimensions, this is replaced by N position coordinates, which we label x_{1}, ..., x_{N}. Corresponding to each position coordinate is a momentum; we label these p_{1}, ..., p_{N}. The canonical commutation relations between these operators are
$$\begin{align}
{[}x_i , p_j{]} &= i\hbar\delta_{i,j} \\
{[}x_i , x_j{]} &= 0                  \\
{[}p_i , p_j{]} &= 0
\end{align}$$

The Hamiltonian for this system is
$$H = \sum_{i=1}^N \left( {p_i^2 \over 2m} + {1\over 2} m \omega^2 x_i^2 \right).$$

As the form of this Hamiltonian makes clear, the N-dimensional harmonic oscillator is exactly analogous to N independent one-dimensional harmonic oscillators with the same mass and spring constant. In this case, the quantities x_{1}, ..., x_{N} would refer to the positions of each of the N particles. This is a convenient property of the r^{2} potential, which allows the potential energy to be separated into terms depending on one coordinate each.

This observation makes the solution straightforward. For a particular set of quantum numbers $\{n\}\equiv \{n_1, n_2, \dots, n_N\}$ the energy eigenfunctions for the N-dimensional oscillator are expressed in terms of the 1-dimensional eigenfunctions as:

$$\langle \mathbf{x}|\psi_{\{n\}}\rangle = \prod_{i=1}^N\langle x_i\mid \psi_{n_i}\rangle$$

In the ladder operator method, we define N sets of ladder operators,

$$\begin{align}
a_i &= \sqrt{m\omega \over 2\hbar} \left(x_i + {i \over m \omega} p_i \right), \\
a^{\dagger}_i &= \sqrt{m \omega \over 2\hbar} \left( x_i - {i \over m \omega} p_i \right).
\end{align}$$

By an analogous procedure to the one-dimensional case, we can then show that each of the a_{i} and a_{i}^{†} operators lower and raise the energy by ℏω respectively. The Hamiltonian is
$$H = \hbar \omega \, \sum_{i=1}^N \left(a_i^\dagger \,a_i + \frac{1}{2}\right).$$
This Hamiltonian is invariant under the dynamic symmetry group U(N) (the unitary group in N dimensions), defined by
$$U\, a_i^\dagger \,U^\dagger = \sum_{j=1}^N  a_j^\dagger\,U_{ji}\quad\text{for all}\quad
U \in U(N),$$
where $U_{ji}$ is an element in the defining matrix representation of U(N).

The energy levels of the system are
$$E = \hbar \omega \left[(n_1 + \cdots + n_N) + {N\over 2}\right].$$
$$n_i = 0, 1, 2, \dots \quad (\text{the energy level in dimension } i).$$

As in the one-dimensional case, the energy is quantized. The ground state energy is N times the one-dimensional ground energy, as we would expect using the analogy to N independent one-dimensional oscillators. There is one further difference: in the one-dimensional case, each energy level corresponds to a unique quantum state. In N-dimensions, except for the ground state, the energy levels are degenerate, meaning there are several states with the same energy.

The degeneracy can be calculated relatively easily. As an example, consider the 3-dimensional case: Define n = n_{1} + n_{2} + n_{3}. All states with the same n will have the same energy. For a given n, we choose a particular n_{1}. Then n_{2} + n_{3} = n − n_{1}. There are n − n_{1} + 1 possible pairs {n_{2}, n_{3}}. n_{2} can take on the values 0 to n − n_{1}, and for each n_{2} the value of n_{3} is fixed. The degree of degeneracy therefore is:
$$g_n = \sum_{n_1=0}^n n - n_1 + 1 = \frac{(n+1)(n+2)}{2}$$
Formula for general N and n [g_{n} being the dimension of the symmetric irreducible n-th power representation of the unitary group U(N)]:
$$g_n = \binom{N+n-1}{n} = \frac{(N+n-1)!}{n! (N-1)!}, \;\;\; n = n_1+n_2+n_3 + \cdots .$$
The special case N = 3, given above, follows directly from this general equation. This is however, only true for distinguishable particles, i.e. in Maxwell-Boltzmann statistics (not in quantum statistics) or one particle in N dimensions (as dimensions are distinguishable). For the case of N bosons in a one-dimension harmonic trap, the degeneracy scales as the number of ways to partition an integer n using integers less than or equal to N. It can be shown that the large-$E$ asymptotic behavior of the degeneracy $g_n$ is practically independent of the energy $E$ - different from the classical case in which this diverges. This degeneracy is

$$g_n = p(N_{-},n).$$

This arises due to the constraint of putting N quanta into a state ket where $\sum_{k=0}^\infty k n_k = n$ and $\sum_{k=0}^\infty n_k = N$, which are the same constraints as in integer partition.

=== Example: 3D isotropic harmonic oscillator ===
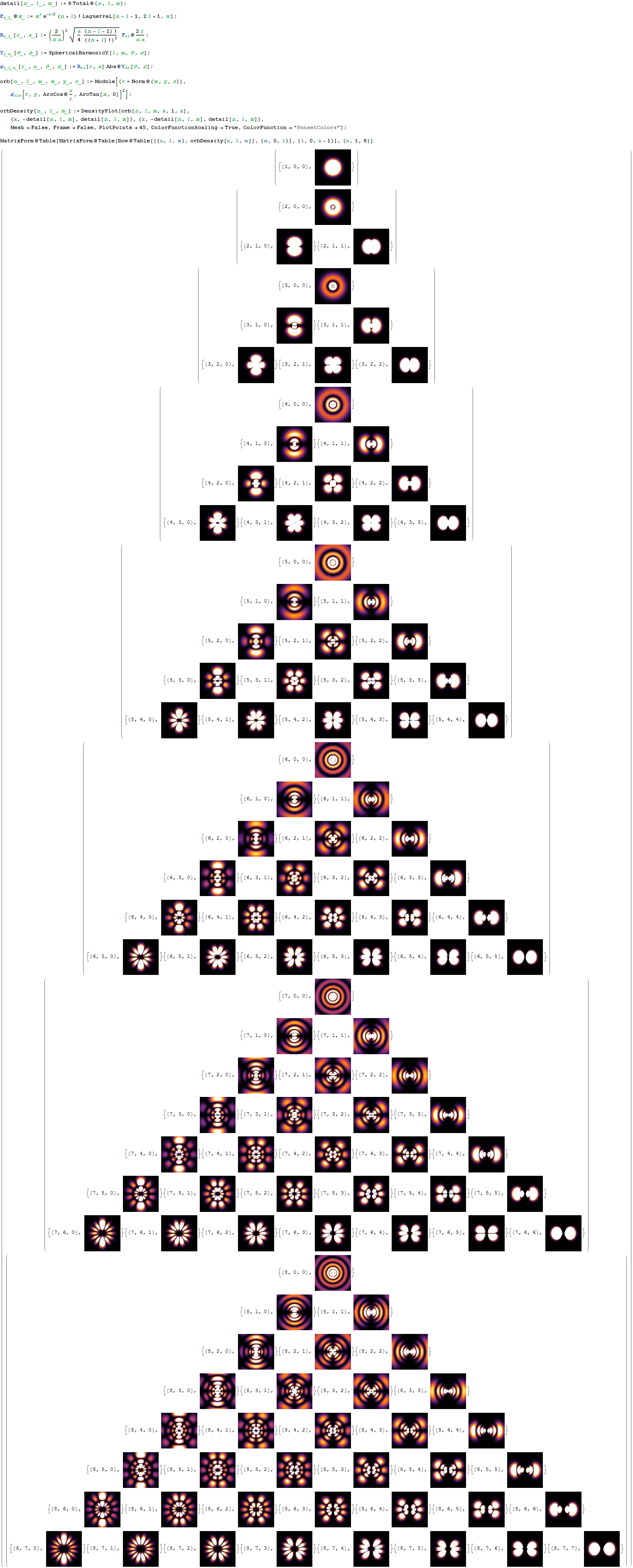
Schrödinger 3D spherical harmonic orbital solutions in 2D density plots; the Mathematica source code that used for generating the plots is at the top

The Schrödinger equation for a particle in a spherically-symmetric three-dimensional harmonic oscillator can be solved explicitly by separation of variables. This procedure is analogous to the separation performed in the hydrogen-like atom problem, but with a different spherically symmetric potential
$$V(r) = {1\over 2} \mu \omega^2 r^2,$$
where μ is the mass of the particle. Because m will be used below for the magnetic quantum number, mass is indicated by μ, instead of m, as earlier in this article.

The solution to the equation is:
$$\psi_{klm}(r,\theta,\phi) = N_{kl} r^{l}e^{-\nu r^2}L_k^{\left(l+{1\over 2}\right)}(2\nu r^2) Y_{lm}(\theta,\phi)$$
where

$N_{kl}=\sqrt{\sqrt{\frac{2\nu^3}{\pi }}\frac{2^{k+2l+3}\;k!\;\nu^l}{(2k+2l+1)!!}}~~$ is a normalization constant; $\nu \equiv {\mu \omega \over 2 \hbar}~$;
$${L_k}^{(l+{1\over 2})}(2\nu r^2)$$

are generalized Laguerre polynomials; The order k of the polynomial is a non-negative integer, coinciding with the number of nodes of the radial part of the wavefunction;

- $Y_{lm}(\theta,\phi)\,$ is a spherical harmonic function;
- ħ is the reduced Planck constant: $\hbar\equiv\frac{h}{2\pi}~.$

The energy eigenvalue is
$$E=\hbar \omega \left(2k + l + \frac{3}{2}\right) .$$
The energy is usually described by the single quantum number
$$n\equiv 2k+l  \,.$$

Because k is a non-negative integer, for every even n we have ℓ = 0, 2, ..., n − 2, n and for every odd n we have ℓ = 1, 3, ..., n − 2, n . The magnetic quantum number m is an integer satisfying −ℓ ≤ m ≤ ℓ, so for every n and ℓ there are 2ℓ + 1 different quantum states, labeled by m . Thus, the degeneracy at level n is
$$\sum_{l=\ldots,n-2,n} (2l+1) = {(n+1)(n+2)\over 2} \,,$$
where the sum starts from 0 or 1, according to whether n is even or odd. This result is in accordance with the dimension formula above, and amounts to the dimensionality of a symmetric representation of SU(3), the relevant degeneracy group.

== Applications ==
=== Harmonic oscillators lattice: phonons ===
The notation of a harmonic oscillator can be extended to a one-dimensional lattice of many particles. Consider a one-dimensional quantum mechanical harmonic chain of N identical atoms. This is the simplest quantum mechanical model of a lattice, and we will see how phonons arise from it. The formalism that we will develop for this model is readily generalizable to two and three dimensions. As in the previous section, we denote the positions of the masses by x_{1}, x_{2}, ..., as measured from their equilibrium positions (i.e. x_{i} = 0 if the particle i is at its equilibrium position). In two or more dimensions, the x_{i} are vector quantities. The Hamiltonian for this system is

$$\mathbf{H} = \sum_{i=1}^N {p_i^2 \over 2m} + {1\over 2} m \omega^2 \sum_{\{ij\} (nn)} (x_i - x_j)^2 \,,$$
where m is the (assumed uniform) mass of each atom, and x_{i} and p_{i} are the position and momentum operators for the i th atom and the sum is made over the nearest neighbors (nn). However, it is customary to rewrite the Hamiltonian in terms of the normal modes of the wavevector rather than in terms of the particle coordinates so that one can work in the more convenient Fourier space.

Superposition of three oscillating dipoles- illustrate the time propagation of the common wave function for different n,l,m

We introduce, then, a set of N "normal coordinates" Q_{k}, defined as the discrete Fourier transforms of the xs, and N "conjugate momenta" Π defined as the Fourier transforms of the ps,
$$Q_k = {1\over\sqrt{N}} \sum_{l} e^{ikal} x_l$$
$$\Pi_{k} = {1\over\sqrt{N}} \sum_{l}  e^{-ikal} p_l \,.$$

The quantity k_{n} will turn out to be the wave number of the phonon, i.e. 2π divided by the wavelength. It takes on quantized values, because the number of atoms is finite.

This preserves the desired commutation relations in either real space or wave vector space

Another illustration of the time propagation of the common wave function for three different atoms emphasizes the effect of the angular momentum on the distribution behavior

$$\begin{align}
\left[x_l , p_m \right]&=i\hbar\delta_{l,m} \\
\left[ Q_k , \Pi_{k'} \right] &={1\over N} \sum_{l,m} e^{ikal} e^{-ik'am}  [x_l , p_m ] \\
&= {i \hbar\over N} \sum_{m} e^{iam(k-k')} = i\hbar\delta_{k,k'} \\
\left[ Q_k , Q_{k'} \right] &= \left[ \Pi_k , \Pi_{k'} \right] = 0 ~.
\end{align}$$

From the general result
$$\begin{align}
\sum_{l}x_l x_{l+m}&={1\over N}\sum_{kk'}Q_k Q_{k'}\sum_{l} e^{ial\left(k+k'\right)}e^{iamk'}= \sum_{k}Q_k Q_{-k}e^{iamk} \\
\sum_{l}{p_l}^2 &= \sum_{k}\Pi_k \Pi_{-k}   ~,
\end{align}$$
it is easy to show, through elementary trigonometry, that the potential energy term is
$$\begin{align}
{1\over 2} m \omega^2 \sum_{j} \left(x_j - x_{j+1}\right)^2 &= {1\over 2} m \omega^2\sum_{k}Q_k Q_{-k} \left(2-e^{ika}-e^{-ika}\right) \\
&= {1\over 2} m \sum_{k}{\omega_k}^2 Q_k Q_{-k} ~ ,
\end{align}$$
where
$$\omega_k = \sqrt{2 \omega^2 (1 - \cos(ka))} ~.$$

The Hamiltonian may be written in wave vector space as
$$\mathbf{H} = {1\over {2m}}\sum_k \left(
{ \Pi_k\Pi_{-k} } + m^2 \omega_k^2 Q_k Q_{-k}
\right) ~.$$

Note that the couplings between the position variables have been transformed away; if the Qs and Πs were Hermitian (which they are not), the transformed Hamiltonian would describe N uncoupled harmonic oscillators.

The form of the quantization depends on the choice of boundary conditions; for simplicity, we impose periodic boundary conditions, defining the (N + 1)-th atom as equivalent to the first atom. Physically, this corresponds to joining the chain at its ends. The resulting quantization is

$$k=k_n = {2n\pi \over Na}
\quad \hbox{for}\ n = 0, \pm1, \pm2, \ldots , \pm {N \over 2}.$$

The upper bound to n comes from the minimum wavelength, which is twice the lattice spacing a, as discussed above.

The harmonic oscillator eigenvalues or energy levels for the mode ω_{k} are
$$E_n = \left({1\over2}+n\right)\hbar\omega_k   \quad\hbox{for}\quad n=0,1,2,3,\ldots$$

If we ignore the zero-point energy then the levels are evenly spaced at
$$0 , \ \hbar\omega , \ 2\hbar\omega , \ 3\hbar\omega , \ \cdots$$

So an exact amount of energy ħω, must be supplied to the harmonic oscillator lattice to push it to the next energy level. In analogy to the photon case when the electromagnetic field is quantised, the quantum of vibrational energy is called a phonon.

All quantum systems show wave-like and particle-like properties. The particle-like properties of the phonon are best understood using the methods of second quantization and operator techniques described elsewhere.

In the continuum limit, a → 0, N → ∞, while Na is held fixed. The canonical coordinates Q_{k} devolve to the decoupled momentum modes of a scalar field, $\phi_k$, whilst the location index i (not the displacement dynamical variable) becomes the parameter x argument of the scalar field, $\phi (x,t)$.

=== Molecular vibrations ===
- The vibrations of a diatomic molecule are an example of a two-body version of the quantum harmonic oscillator. In this case, the angular frequency is given by
  $$\omega = \sqrt{\frac{k}{\mu}}$$
  where $\mu = \frac{m_1 m_2}{m_1 + m_2}$ is the reduced mass and $m_1$ and $m_2$ are the masses of the two atoms.
- Modelling phonons, as discussed above.
- A charge $q$ with mass $m$ in a uniform magnetic field $\mathbf{B}$ is an example of a one-dimensional quantum harmonic oscillator: Landau quantization.
- The harmonic oscillator model approximates the internuclear potential of a diatomic molecule, with lower vibrational states closely resembling the model and higher states deviating due to anharmonicity.

=== Hooke's law ===
- The Hooke's atom is a simple model of the helium atom using the quantum harmonic oscillator.
- Hooke's law models a mass moving on a spring where the force acting on the mass is proportional to its displacement.
- The general solution for a mass on a spring can be derived from this assumption.
- The displacement of the mass reaches a maxima and a minima at A and -A where A is called the amplitude.
- This system is considered a conservative system where total energy remains unchanged and is being continuously redistributed between kinetic and potential energy.

=== The inverted harmonic oscillator ===
The inverted harmonic oscillator has been investigated in detail by G. Barton. See also H.J.W. Müller-Kirsten and C. Yuce, A. Killen and A. Coruh.

=== The Dirac oscillator ===
The consideration of the harmonic oscillator e.g. from the energy $E={\bold p}^2/2m + m\omega^2q^2/2$ in analogy to a derivation of the Dirac equation – so-to-speak from the "square root" of the equation $p_{\mu}p^{\mu} + m^2=0$ – has been explored by Lorella M. Jones.

== See also ==
- Quantum pendulum
- Quantum machine – Quantum mechanical macroscopic object
- Gas in a harmonic trap – Quantum mechanical model
- Creation and annihilation operators – Operators useful in quantum mechanics
- Coherent state – Specific quantum state of a quantum harmonic oscillator
- Morse potential – Model for the potential energy of a diatomic molecule
- Bertrand's theorem – Physics theorem
- Mehler kernel – Complex-valued function
- Molecular vibration – Periodic motion of the atoms of a molecule

== Bibliography ==
- Griffiths, David J. (2004). Introduction to Quantum Mechanics (2nd ed.). Prentice Hall. ISBN 978-0-13-805326-0.
- Liboff, Richard L. (2002). Introductory Quantum Mechanics. Addison–Wesley. ISBN 978-0-8053-8714-8.
- Müller-Kirsten, Harald J.W. (2012). Introduction to Quantum Mechanics: Schrödinger Equation and Path Integral (2nd ed.). World Scientific. ISBN 978-0-9810-4397-5.
- Zwiebach, Barton (2022). Mastering Quantum Mechanics: Essentials, Theory, and Applications. MIT Press. ISBN 978-0-262-04613-8.
