= Pöschl–Teller potential =

Quantum mechanical potential

In mathematical physics, a Pöschl–Teller potential is a special class of potentials for which the one-dimensional Schrödinger equation can be solved in terms of special functions. It is named after the physicists Gertrud Pöschl (Note: Some sources cite her as Hertha Pöschl.) and Edward Teller who developed it in 1933.

== Definition ==
In its symmetric form is explicitly given by

Symmetric Pöschl–Teller potential: $-\frac{\lambda(\lambda +1)}{2} \operatorname{sech}^2(x)$. It shows the eigenvalues for μ=1, 2, 3, 4, 5, 6.

$$V(x) =-\frac{\lambda(\lambda+1)}{2}\mathrm{sech}^2(x)$$

and the solutions of the time-independent Schrödinger equation

$$-\frac{1}{2}\psi''(x)+ V(x)\psi(x)=E\psi(x)$$

with this potential can be found by virtue of the substitution $u=\mathrm{tanh(x)}$, which yields

$$\left[(1-u^2)\psi'(u)\right]'+\lambda(\lambda+1)\psi(u)+\frac{2E}{1-u^2}\psi(u)=0$$.

Thus the solutions $\psi(u)$ are just the Legendre functions $P_\lambda^\mu(\tanh(x))$ with $E=-\frac{\mu^2}{2}$, and $\lambda=1, 2, 3\cdots$, $\mu=1, 2, \cdots, \lambda-1, \lambda$. Moreover, eigenvalues and scattering data can be explicitly computed. In the special case of integer $\lambda$, the potential is reflectionless and such potentials also arise as the N-soliton solutions of the Korteweg–De Vries equation.

The more general form of the potential is given by

$$V(x) =-\frac{\lambda(\lambda+1)}{2}\mathrm{sech}^2(x) - \frac{\nu(\nu+1)}{2}\mathrm{csch}^2(x)  .$$

== Related potentials ==
The symmetric form of the Poschl–Teller potential is a special case of the Epstein profile, also called Eckart potential or hyperbolic Rosen–Morse potential.

$$V(x) =-\frac{\lambda(\lambda+1)}{2}\mathrm{sech}^2(x) - g \tanh x.$$
