= Women in physics =

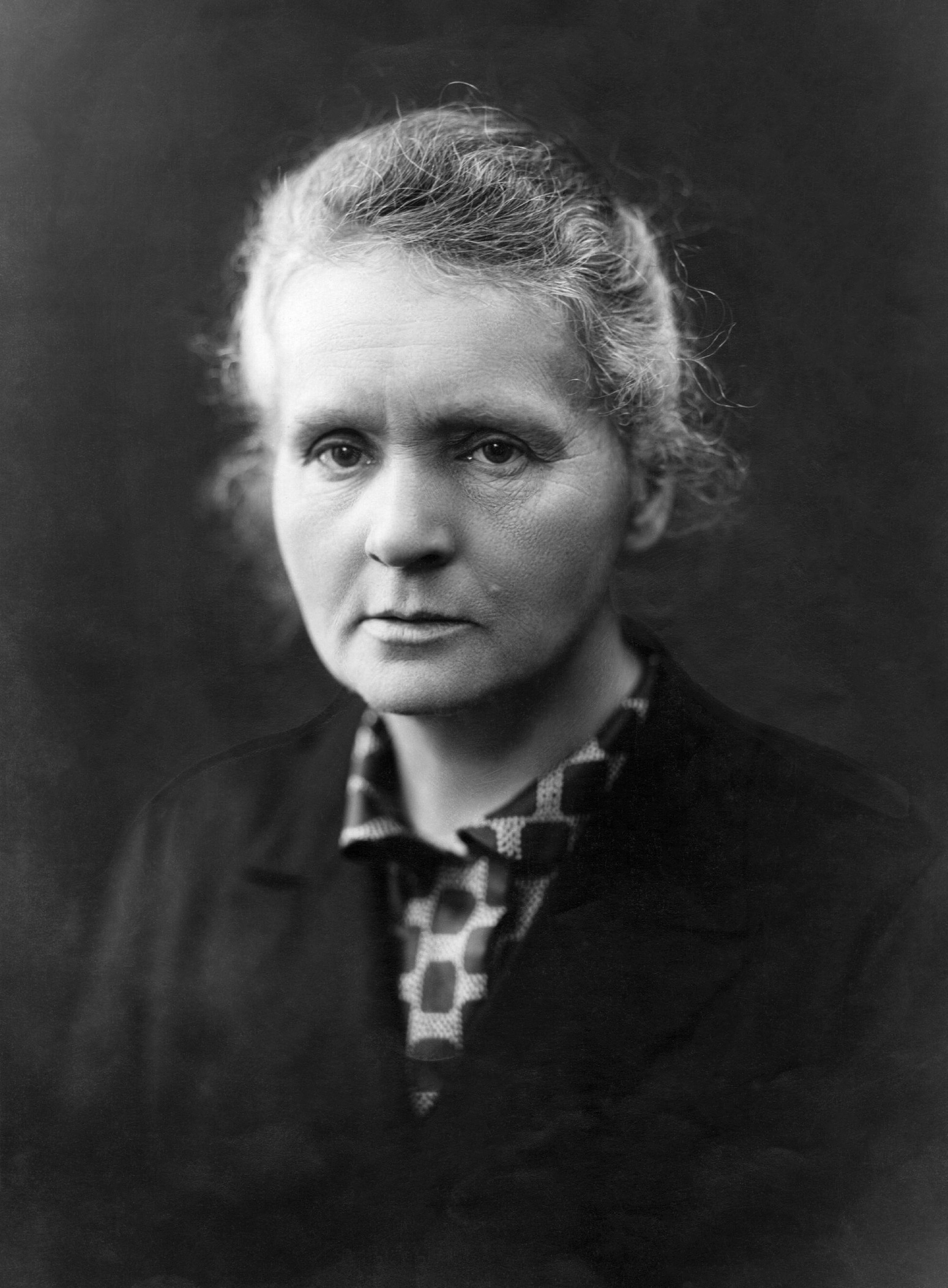
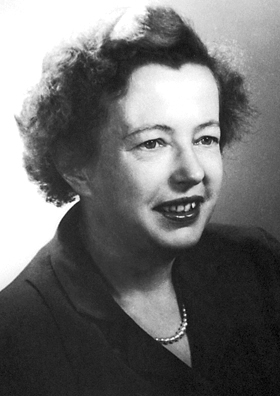
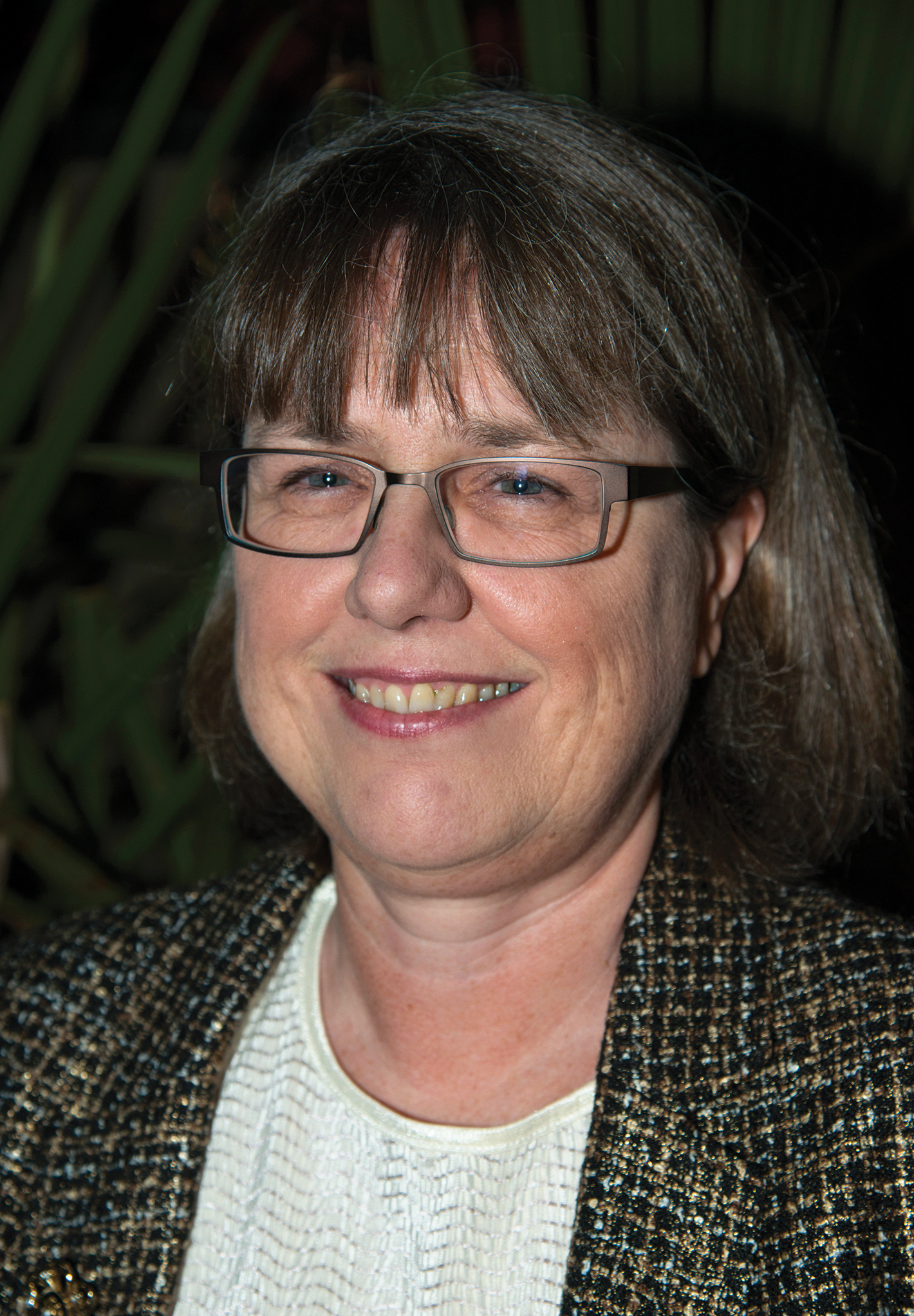
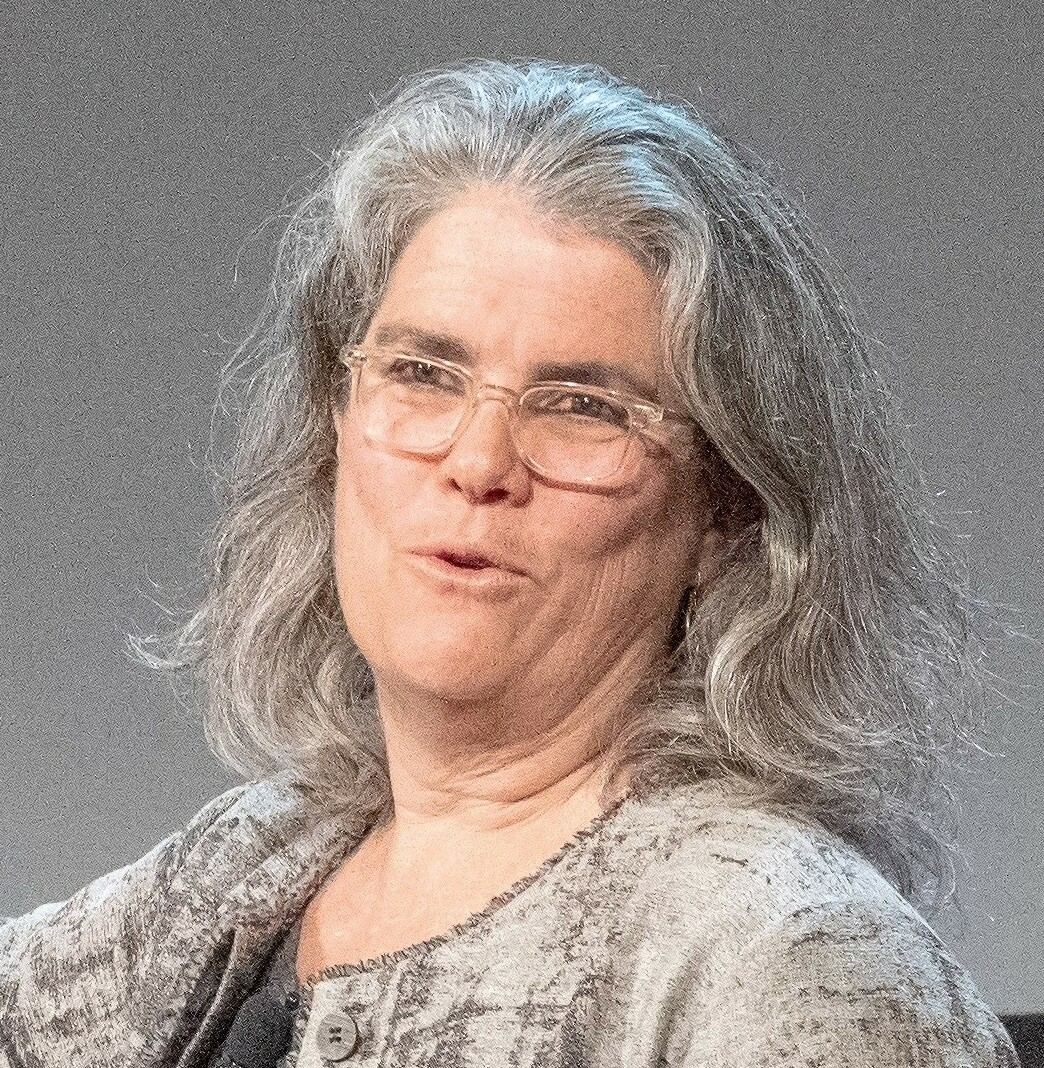
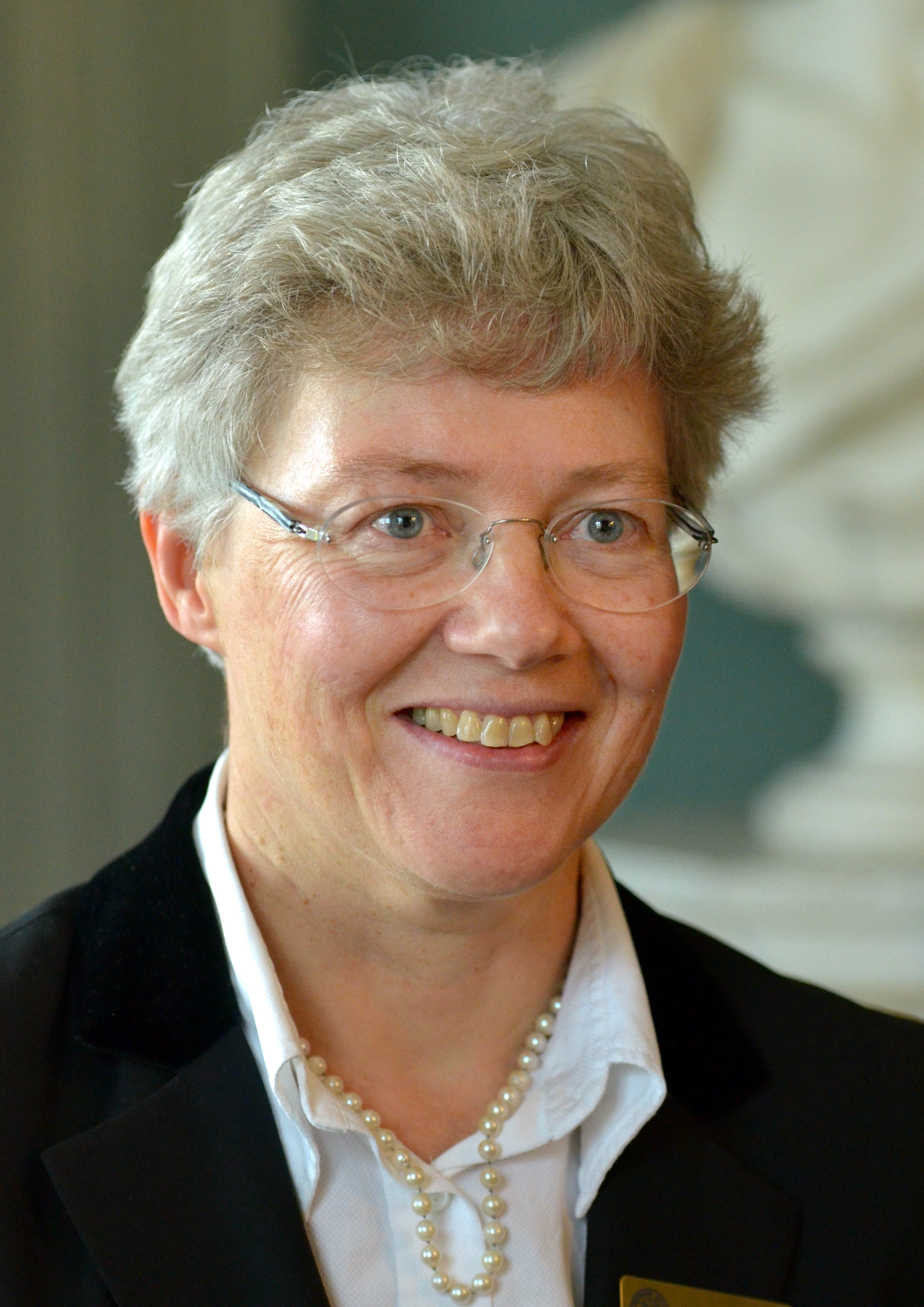
Female Nobel laureates in physics (left to right, top to bottom)
Marie Curie – Maria Goeppert Mayer – Donna Strickland
Andrea Ghez – Anne L'Huillier

This article discusses women who have made an important contribution to the field of physics.

== International physics awards ==
=== Nobel laureates ===
Five women have won the Nobel Prize in Physics, awarded annually since 1901 by the Royal Swedish Academy of Sciences. These are:

- 1903 Marie Curie: "in recognition of the extraordinary services they have rendered by their joint researches on the radiation phenomena discovered by Professor Henri Becquerel"
- 1963 Maria Goeppert Mayer: "for their discoveries concerning nuclear shell structure"
- 2018 Donna Strickland: "for their method high-intensity, ultra-short optical pulses"
- 2020 Andrea Ghez: "for the discovery of a supermassive compact object at the centre of our galaxy."
- 2023 Anne L'Huillier "for experimental methods that generate attosecond pulses of light for the study of electron dynamics in matter."

Marie Curie was the first woman to be nominated in 1902 and to receive the prize in 1903 and shared 1/2 of the prize with her husband Pierre Curie for their joint work on radioactivity, discovered by Henri Becquerel who got the other half of the prize. Marie Curie was the first woman to also receive the Nobel Prize in Chemistry in 1911, making her the first person to win two Nobel prizes and, as of 2023, the only person to be awarded two Nobel prizes in two different scientific categories.

Maria Goeppert Mayer became the second woman to win the prize in 1963, for the theoretical development of the nuclear shell model, a half of the prize shared with J. Hans D. Jensen (the other half given to Eugene Wigner). Donna Strickland shared half of the prize in 2018 with Gérard Mourou, for their work in chirped pulse amplification beginning in the 1980s (the other half given to Arthur Ashkin). Andrea Ghez was the fourth female Nobel laureate in 2020, she shared one half of the prize with Reinhard Genzel for the discovery of the supermassive compact object Sagittarius A* at the center of our galaxy (the other half given to Roger Penrose). In 2023, Anne L'Huillier shared the prize in equal parts with Pierre Agostini and Ferenc Krausz for their experimental contribution and development of attosecond physics. L'Huillier is the first female laureate to receive 1/3 of monetary award of the Nobel Prize in Physics (Curie, Goeppert–Mayer, Strickland and Ghez received 1/4).

Physicists and physicochemists that won a Nobel Prize in Chemistry include Marie Curie, Irène Joliot-Curie, daughter of Marie Curie, in 1935, and Dorothy Hodgkin in 1964. Nuclear physicist Rosalyn Sussman Yalow was the second female scientist to win the Nobel Prize in Physiology or Medicine in 1977 for the development of radioimmunoassays. Human right activist and 2023 Nobel Peace Prize, Narges Mohammadi, was trained in nuclear physics.

==== Nobel nominees and nominators ====
According to the Nobel archives (updated up to 1974), other physicists that were nominated to the Nobel Prize in Physics but did not receive it, include:

- Lise Meitner, nominated 26 times;
- Chien-Shiung Wu, nominated 9 times;
- Marietta Blau, nominated 4 times;
- and Hertha Wambacher, Margaret Burbidge, Janine Connes, Phyllis S. Freier and Isabella Karle, nominated once.

Irène Joliot-Curie and Dorothy Hodgkin were also nominated for the Nobel Prize in Physics, but received a Nobel Prize in Chemistry in 1935 and 1964, respectively. Lise Meitner is the female physicist the most nominated, 16 times for Physics and 14 times for Chemistry. About 1.7% of the Nobel nominations in Physics up to 1970 were women.

Aside from the named above, other physicists and physicochemists that were nominated to the Nobel Prize in Chemistry but dit not receive it, include Ida Noddack, Marguerite Perey, Alberte Pullman, and Erika Cremer.

Up to 1974, ten female scientists have participated as nominators for the Nobel Prize in Physics. These are Katharina Boll-Dornberger, Margaret Burbidge, Marie Curie, Inga Fischer-Hjalmars, Maria Goeppert Mayer, Dorothy Hodgkin, Berta Karlik, Hertha Sponer, Marie-Antoinette Tonnelat and Anne Barbara Underhill.

==== Clarivate Citation ====
Several women have been selected as Clarivate Citation laureates in Physics, which makes an annual list of possible candidates for the Nobel Prize in Physics based on citation statistics, these include:

- 2008 Vera Rubin † "for her pioneering research indicating the existence of dark matter in the universe."
- 2012 Lene Hau "for the experimental demonstration of electromagnetically induced transparency 'slow light' (with Stephen E. Harris)."
- 2015 Deborah S. Jin † "for pioneering research on atomic gases at ultra-cold temperatures and the creation of the first fermionic condensate."
- 2018 Sandra Faber "for pioneering methods to determine the age, size and distance of galaxies and for other contributions to cosmology."
- 2023 Sharon Glotzer "for demonstrating the role of entropy in the self-assembly of matter and for introducing strategies to control the assembly process to engineer new materials."
- 2025 Ewine van Dishoeck "for pioneering contributions to astrochemistry revealing interstellar molecular clouds and their role in star and planet formation" and Ingrid Daubechies "for advancing wavelet theory, a revolution in mathematics and physics with practical applications including image processing".
- 2026 Nicola Spaldin "for fundamental theoretical developments leading to the establishment of room-temperature magnetoelectric multiferroics, which are enabling new energy-efficient device paradigms."

†: deceased, no longer eligible.

=== Wolf Prize ===
Two women have been awarded the Wolf Prize in Physics, awarded by the Wolf Foundation in Israel since 1978. They are:

- 1978 Chien-Shiung Wu (inaugural), "for her explorations of the weak interaction, helping establish the precise form and the non-conservation of parity for this natural force."
- 2022 Anne L'Huillier, "for pioneering contributions to ultrafast laser science and attosecond physics".

=== Breakthrough Prize ===
Women who have been awarded the Breakthrough Prize in Fundamental Physics since 2012, include:

- 2018 WMAP Probe team, 27 listed members, including Hiranya Peiris, Licia Verde, Janet L. Weiland and Joanna Dunkley for "For detailed maps of the early universe that greatly improved our knowledge of the evolution of the cosmos and the fluctuations that seeded the formation of galaxies."
- 2018 Special recognition to Jocelyn Bell Burnell for "For fundamental contributions to the discovery of pulsars, and a lifetime of inspiring leadership in the scientific community."

=== Prizes only for female physicists ===
- L'Oréal-UNESCO For Women in Science Awards awarded bi-annually to one laureate per continent for outstanding contributions to the physical sciences.
- Maria Goeppert-Mayer Award of the American Physical Society awarded annually in recognition of an outstanding contribution to physics research.
- Jocelyn Bell Burnell Medal and Prize by the Institute of Physics in UK, for contributions to physics by a very early career physicist.
- Annie Jump Cannon Award in Astronomy awarded annually for outstanding contributions to astronomy within five years of earning a doctorate degree.

== Topics named after female scientists ==
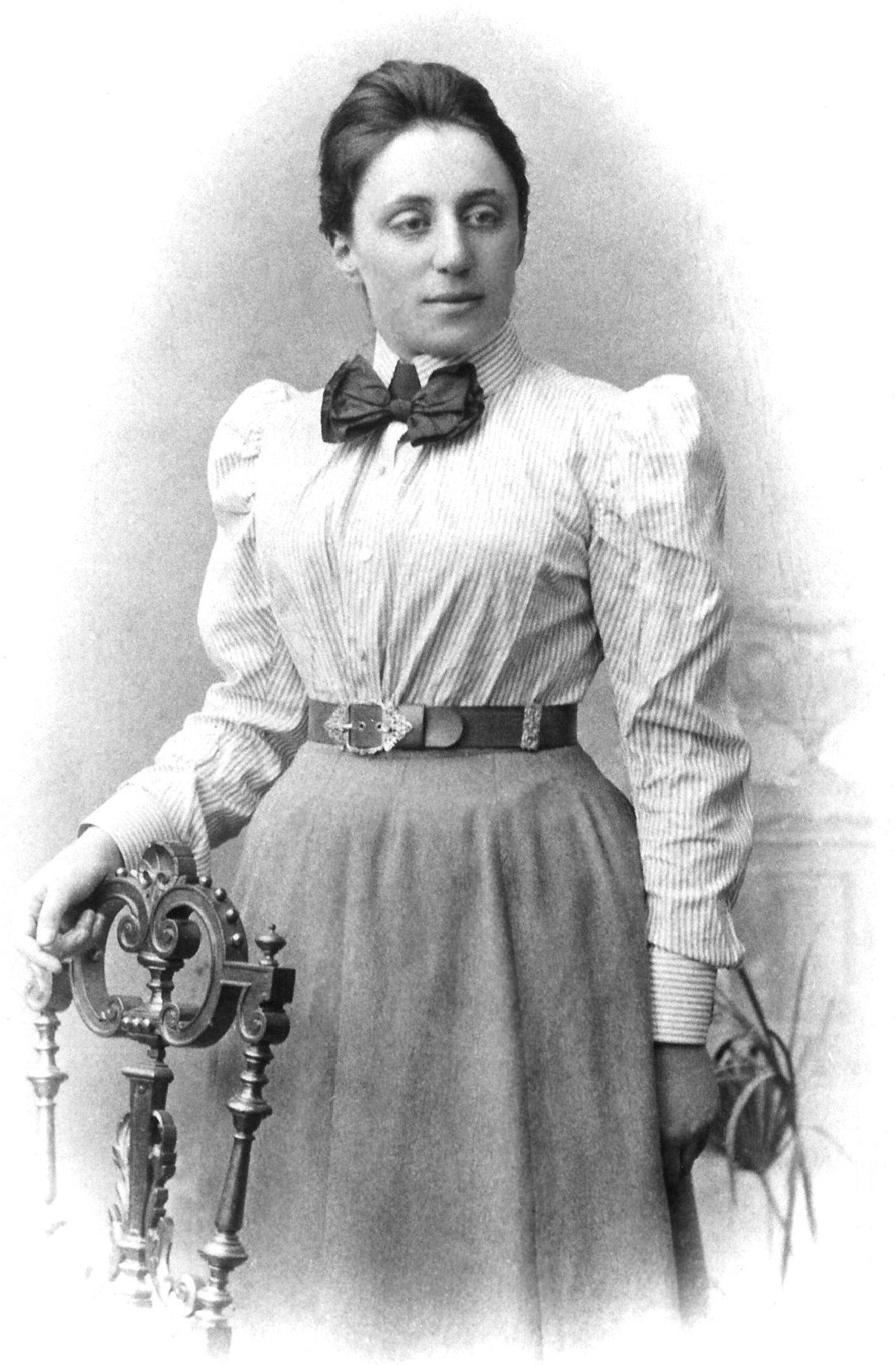
Emmy Noether who published the Noether's theorem in 1918. The theorem relates symmetries to conserved quantities in physics.

Female scientists have sometimes not been recognized in the naming of topics they discovered due to what has been called the Matilda effect, a bias in which the accomplishments of women scientists are ascribed to their male colleagues.

Some physics phenomena that are named after female scientists include:

=== Physical models and theories ===
- Birge–Sponer method, in molecular physics, partially named after Hertha Sponer.
- Coulson–Fischer theory, in molecular physics, partially named after Inga Fischer-Hjalmars
- Fermi–Pasta–Ulam–Tsingou problem in chaos theory, partially named after Mary Tsingou.
- Frenkel–Kontorova model, in non-linear physics, partially named after Tatiana Kontorova.
- Hopfield model, in atmospheric physics, is named after Helen Hopfield.
- Kachru–Kalosh–Linde–Trivedi mechanism, in string theory, is partially named after Renata Kallosh.
- Kovalevskaya top in rotational dynamics, named after Sofya Kovalevskaya.
- Peccei–Quinn theory in particle physics, partially named after Helen Quinn.
- Pöschl–Teller potential in quantum mechanics, partially named after Gertrud Nordheim-Pöschl.
- Randall–Sundrum model in theoretical physics, partially named after Lisa Randall.
- Falkner–Skan boundary layer in fluid mechanics, partially named after Sylvia Skan
- Van Vleck–Pauli–Morette determinant in quantum mechanics, partially named after Cécile DeWitt-Morette.

=== Physical phenomena and empirical laws ===
- Dubreil-Jacotin–Long equation, in fluid mechanics, partially named after Marie-Louise Dubreil-Jacotin.
- Faber–Jackson relation, in astronomomy, partially named after Sandra Faber.
- Goos–Hänchen effect in optics, partially named after Hilda Hänchen.
- Leavitt's law in astronomy, named after Henrietta Swan Leavitt.
- Huang–Rhys factor, in condensed matter, partially named after Avril Rhys.
- Pockels point in surface physics, named after Agnes Pockels.
- Rubin–Ford effect in cosmology, partially named after Vera Rubin.
- Oppenheimer–Phillips process in nuclear physics, partially named after Melba Phillips.
- Way–Wigner formula in nuclear physics, partially named after Katherine Way

=== Physical theorems ===
- Bohr–Van Leeuwen theorem in thermodynamics, partially named after Hendrika Johanna van Leeuwen
- Byers–Yang theorem, in condensed matter physics, partially named after Nina Byers
- Coffman–Kundu–Wootters inequality, in quantum information, partially named after Valerie Coffman
- Noether's theorem in modern physics, named after Emmy Noether

=== Experiments and equipment ===
- Langmuir–Blodgett film, partially named after Katharine Burr Blodgett
- Curie (unit), Ci, partially named after Marie Curie
- Morton number (dimensionless number), Mo, used to characterize bubbles is named after Rose Morton
- Goeppert Mayer (unit), GM, unit of absorption cross section named after Maria Goeppert Mayer
- Wu experiment named after Chien-Shiung Wu

== Timeline ==
=== Antiquity ===
- c. 150 BCE: Aglaonice becomes the first female astronomer to be recorded in Ancient Greece.
- c. 355–415 CE: Greek astronomer, mathematician and philosopher, Hypatia becomes renowned as a respected academic teacher, editor of Ptolemy's Almagest astronomical data, and head of her own science academy.

=== 16th century ===
- 1572: Astronomer Sophia Brahe assists her older brother Tycho Brahe finding a new bright object in the night sky, now known as called SN 1572 (a supernova). Sophia would help her brother in astronomy throughout his life.

=== 17th century ===
- 1650: Astronomer Maria Cunitz publishes Urania Propitia.
- 1668: After separating from her husband, French polymath Marguerite de la Sablière establishes a popular salon in Paris. Scientists and scholars from different countries visit the salon regularly to discuss ideas and share knowledge, and Sablière studies physics, astronomy and natural history with her guests.
- 1680: Astronomer Jeanne Dumée publishes a summary of arguments supporting the Copernican theory of heliocentrism. She writes "between the brain of a woman and that of a man there is no difference".
- 1690: Astronomer Elisabeth Hevelius publishes Prodromus Astronomiae, compiling the star catalog of 1560 stars by her and her husband Johannes Hevelius.
- 1693–1698: German astronomer and illustrator Maria Clara Eimmart creates more than 350 detailed drawings of the moon phases.

=== 18th century ===
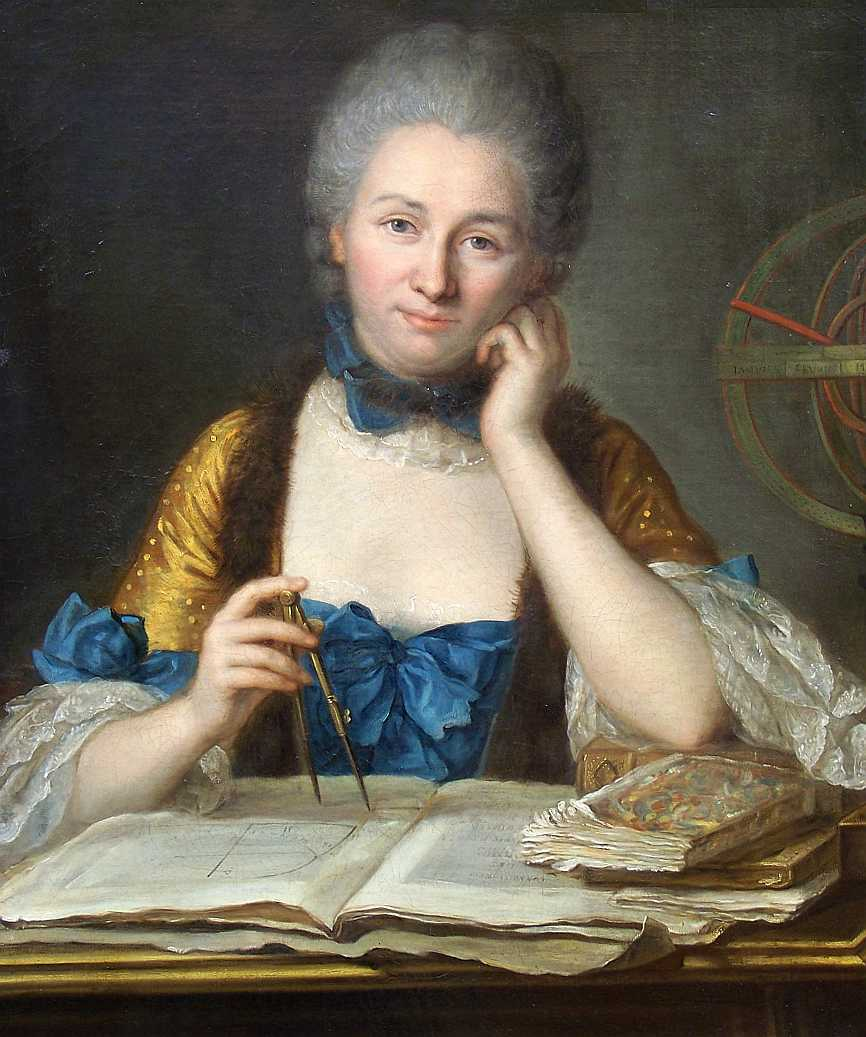
Portrait of Émilie du Châtelet who wrote on the conservation of vis viva, an early version of the conservation of energy

- 1702: Maria Margaretha Kirch becomes the first woman to discover a comet. Her daughters Christine and Margaretha Kirch are also astronomers.
- 1710: Maria Margaretha Kirch asks to be admitted into the Royal Berlin Academy of Sciences. The request is denied.
- 1715: Eustachio Manfredi and his sisters Maddalena and Teresa Manfredi publish Ephemerides of Celestial Motion. The learning of the Manfredi sisters is acknowledged by Pope Benedict XIV.
- 1732: At the age of 20, Italian physicist Laura Bassi becomes the first female member of the Bologna Academy of Sciences. One month later, she publicly defends her academic theses and receives a PhD. Bassi is awarded an honorary position as professor of physics at the University of Bologna. She is the first female physics professor in the world.
- 1738: French polymath Émilie du Châtelet becomes the first woman to have a paper published by the Paris Academy, following a contest on the nature of fire.
- 1740: Du Châtelet publishes Institutions de Physique, or Foundations of Physics, providing a metaphysical basis for Newtonian physics.
- 1751: 19-year-old Italian physicist Cristina Roccati receives her PhD from the University of Bologna.
- 1755: Sculptor Jean-Jacques Caffieri makes a medallion of physicist Maria Angela Ardinghelli to be hung in the French Academy of Sciences, which does not accept female members at the time. Ardinghelli works as the main correspondent and translator between Paris and Naples in terms of physics discussions.
- 1757: Nicole-Reine Lepaute works out the return of Halley's Comet, in collaboration with Alexis Clairaut and Jérôme Lalande.
- 1776: At the University of Bologna, Italian physicist Laura Bassi becomes the first woman appointed as chair of physics at a university.
- 1789: Astronomer Louise du Pierry becomes the first female professor at the Sorbonne.
- 1798: Astronomer Wang Zhenyi writes books on the equinoxes, the Moon motion and eclipses.
- 1798: Marie-Jeanne de Lalande and Princess Charlotte of Saxe-Meiningen are the only female astronomers in the first European Congress of Astronomers.

=== 19th century ===
- 1806: Unaware that his correspondent, French mathematician and physicist Sophie Germain is a woman, Carl Friedrich Gauss recognizes Marie-Jeanne de Lalande as the only woman he knows working in science.
- 1816: Sophie Germain becomes the first woman to win a prize from the Paris Academy of Sciences for her work on elasticity theory.
- 1828: Caroline Herschel, sister of William Herschel, becomes the first woman to publish in the Philosophical Transactions of the Royal Society and is awarded the Gold Medal of the Royal Astronomical Society.
- 1835: Caroline Herschel and Mary Somerville become the first female Honorary Members of the Royal Astronomical Society.
- 1856: Amateur scientist Eunice Newton Foote provides the first demonstration of the warming effect of the sun is greater for air with water vapour than for dry air, and the effect is even greater with carbon dioxide (greenhouse effect).
- 1890: Alice Everett becomes the first woman to be employed and paid at the Royal Observatory, Greenwich.
- 1891: Agnes Pockels, is helped by Rayleigh to publish her first paper on nature of surface tension. There she first introduces the concept of the Pockels point and pioneers the field of surface science.
- 1893: Astronomer Dorothea Klumpke becomes the first woman to earn a Doctor of Science degree at the Sorbonne University.
- 1893: Alice Everett becomes the first woman to have a paper published by the Physical Society of London.
- 1895: Margaret Eliza Maltby becomes the first woman to earn a doctorate in the University of Göttingen.
- 1896: Elizabeth Stephansen becomes the first woman to complete the physics program of Zurich Polytechnic.
- 1897: American physicist Isabelle Stone becomes the first woman to receive a PhD in physics in the United States. She writes her dissertation "On the Electrical Resistance of Thin Films" at the University of Chicago.
- 1898: Danish physicist Kirstine Meyer is awarded the gold medal of the Royal Danish Academy of Sciences and Letters.
- 1888: The Kovalevskaya top, one of a brief list of known examples of integrable rigid body motion, is discovered by Sofia Kovalevskaya.
- 1896: Marie Curie, encouraged by Henri Poincaré, studies the unusual rays emitted by uranium. She coins the term radioactivity.
- 1898: Marie Curie and her husband Pierre discover two new elements radium and polonium.
- 1899:
  - Irish physicist Edith Anne Stoney is appointed a physics lecturer at the London School of Medicine for Women, becoming the first woman medical physicist. She later becomes a pioneering figure in the use of x-ray machines on the front lines of World War I.
  - American physicists Marcia Keith and Isabelle Stone become charter members of the American Physical Society.
  - Elsa Neumann becomes the first woman to earn a doctorate from the University of Berlin, specialized in physics.

=== 20th century ===
==== 1900s ====
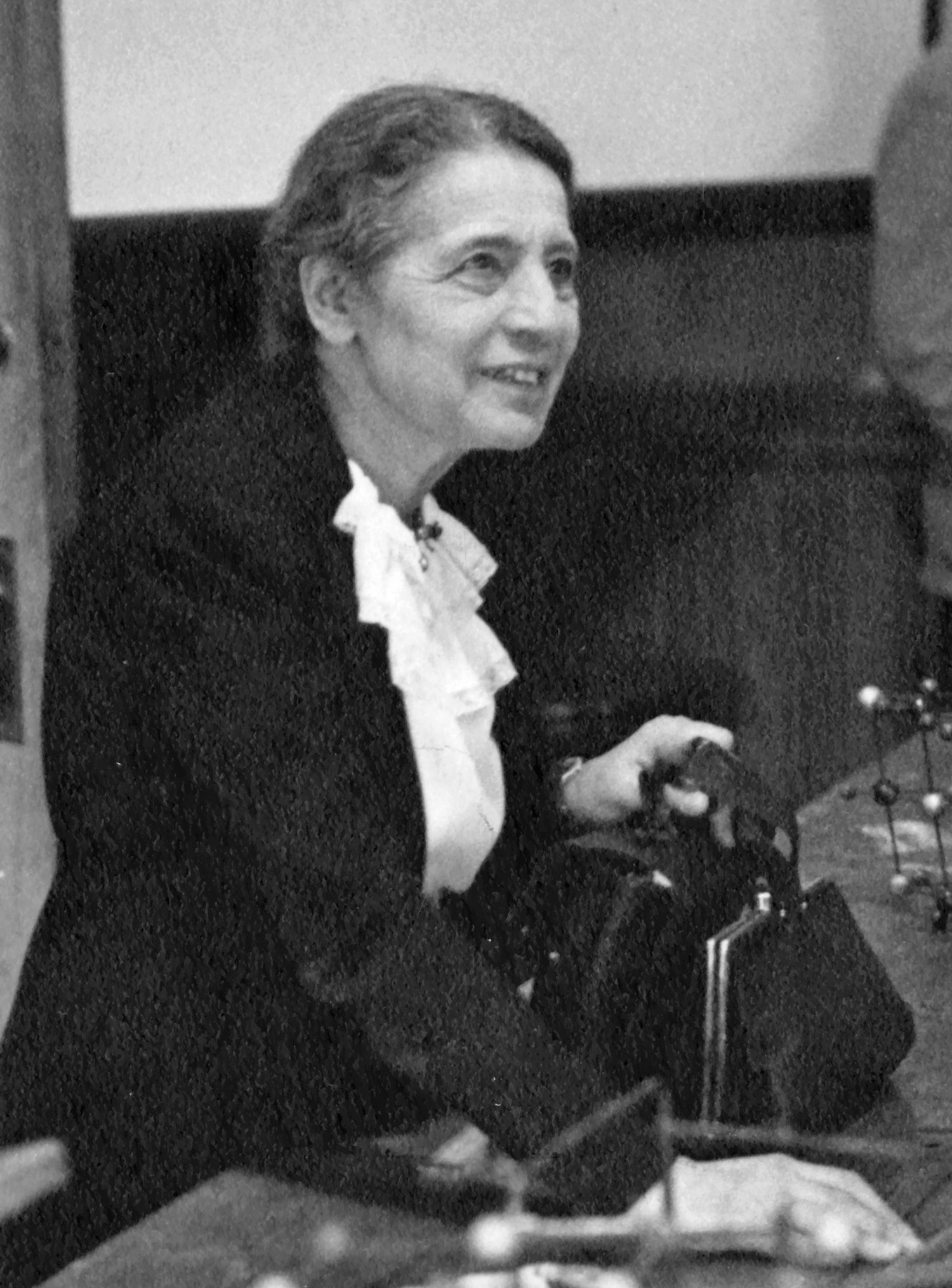
Lise Meitner known for the discovery of nuclear fission

- 1901: Harriet Brooks becomes the first woman to earn a master's degree in Canada at McGill University, later becoming the first female nuclear physicist in Canada.
- 1903: Marie Curie becomes the first woman in France to earn a doctorate in physics.
- 1903: Marie Curie is the first woman to receive a Nobel Prize; she receives the Nobel Prize in Physics along with her husband, Pierre, "for their joint researches on the radiation phenomena discovered by Professor Henri Becquerel", and Henri Becquerel, "for his discovery of spontaneous radioactivity".
- 1900: Physicists Marie Curie and Isabelle Stone attend the International Congress of Physics in Paris, France during the Exposition Universelle. They are the only two women out of 836 participants.
- 1904: Annie S. D. Maunder and her husband Edward Walter Maunder publish the butterfly diagram to study sunspots. They also identify the Maunder Minimum.
- 1906: English physicist, mathematician and engineer Hertha Ayrton becomes the first female recipient of the Hughes Medal from the Royal Society of London. She receives the award for her experimental research on electric arcs and sand ripples. She is also the first woman to be nominated for the Royal Society and to give a lecture to the Society.
- 1907: Tatyana Afanasyeva-Ehrenfest and her husband Paul publish the Ehrenfest model of difussion.
- 1907: Ayrton joins the Suffragettes and the Women's Social and Political Union (WSPU).
- 1908: Eva von Bahr becomes the first female assistant professor in physics in Sweden.
- 1909: Danish physicist Kristine Meyer becomes the first Danish woman to receive a doctorate degree in natural sciences. She writes her dissertation on the topic of "the development of the temperature concept" within the history of physics.

==== 1910s ====
- 1911: Marie Curie becomes the first woman to receive the Nobel Prize in Chemistry, which she received "[for] the discovery of the elements radium and polonium, by the isolation of radium and the study of the nature and compounds of this remarkable element". This makes her the only woman to win two Nobel Prizes.
- 1912: Johanna Reudler (1880-1962), supervised by Hendrik Lorentz, becomes the first woman to ean a doctorate in physics from Leiden University.
- 1912: Astronomer Henrietta Swan Leavitt studies the bright-dim cycle periods of Cepheid stars, then finds a way to calculate the distance from such stars to Earth.
- 1921: Édmée Chandon is admitted at the Paris Observatory, becoming the first female professional astronomer in France.
- 1913: Geertruida de Haas-Lorentz is the first to study of thermal noise in electric circuits, predating the discovery of the Johnson–Nyquist noise.
- 1918: Emmy Noether creates Noether's theorem explaining the connection between symmetry and conservation laws.
- 1918: Luise Lange measures for the first time the electric dipole moment of a molecular solution.
- 1919: Hendrika Johanna van Leeuwen proves the Bohr–Van Leeuwen theorem in her thesis explaining why magnetism is an essentially quantum mechanical effect.

==== 1920s ====
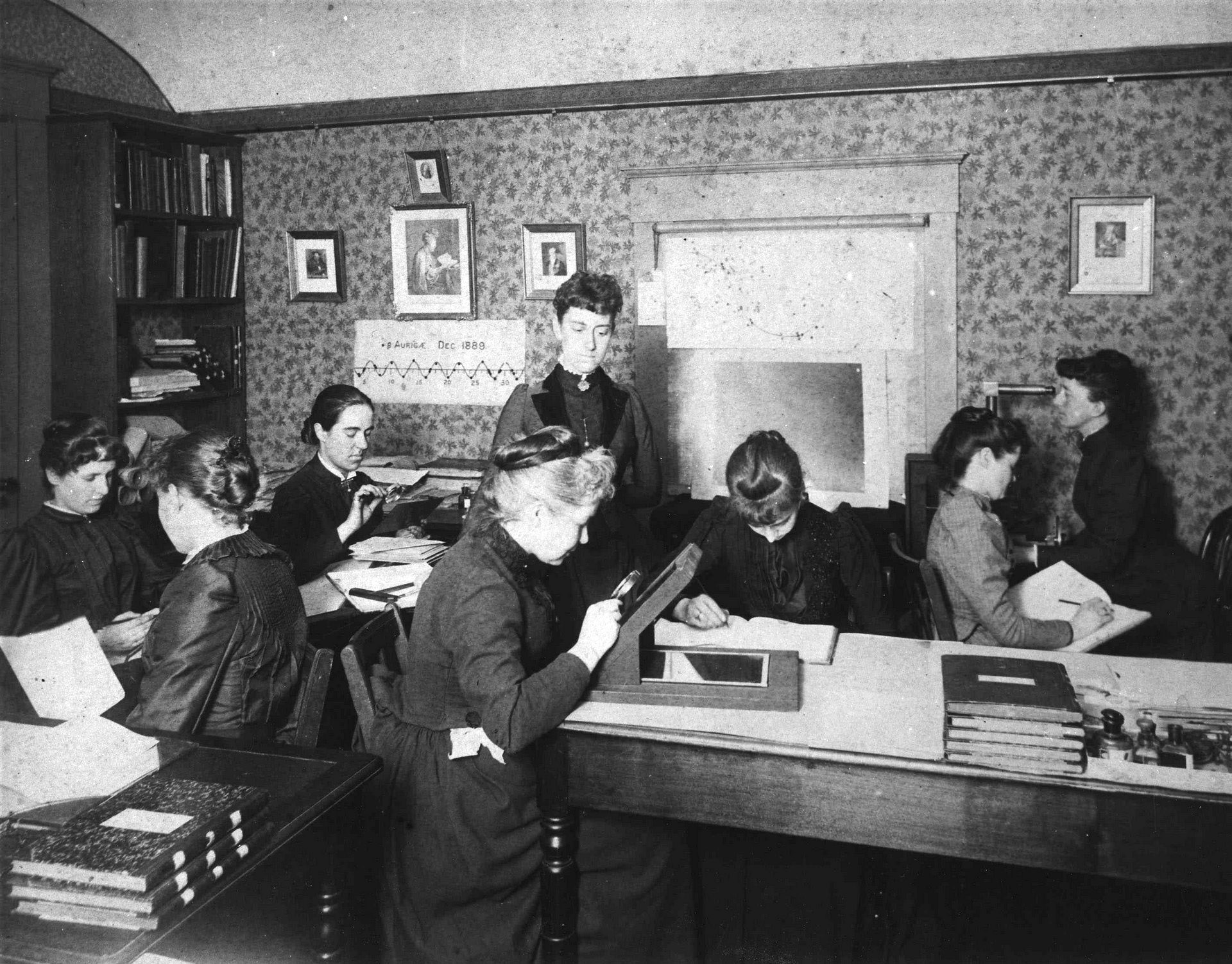
Harvard Computers famous team of women paid to handle astronomical data. This group included Annie Jump Cannon, who introduced the modern procedure for stellar classification, and Henrietta Swan Leavitt, who introduced the period–luminosity relation to calculate the distance of stars.

- 1922: The International Astronomical Union adopts the stellar classification used by Annie Jump Cannon. She comes up with the first serious attempt to organize and classify stars based on their temperatures and spectral types.
- 1922: Lise Meitner becomes the first woman to obtain a Habilitation to teach physics in Germany.
- 1925:
  - Annie Jump Cannon becomes the first woman to receive an honorary doctorate of science from Oxford University.
  - Astrophysicist Cecilia Payne-Gaposchkin establishes that hydrogen is the most common element in stars, and thus the most abundant element in the universe.
  - Hertha Sponer becomes the second woman to obtain a Habilitation to teach physics in Germany.
- 1926: Katharine Burr Blodgett is the first woman to earn a Ph.D. in physics from the University of Cambridge.
- 1926: The first application of quantum mechanics to molecular systems is done by Lucy Mensing. She studies the rotational spectrum of diatomic molecules using the methods of matrix mechanics.
- 1927: Luise Lange provides an explanation for the twin paradox and defends special relativity against critics of Albert Einstein.
- 1927: Marie Curie is the only woman invited to that year's Solvay Conference.
- 1928: Mary Laura Chalk Rowles becomes the first woman to earn a PhD from McGill University. Her work provides first experimental confirmation to Erwin Schrödinger's formulation of quantum mechanics.
- 1930: Maria Goeppert Mayer develops the theory of two-photon absorption in her doctoral thesis.
- 1930: Hedwig Kohn obtains her Habilitation to teach physics. Kohn, Sponer and Meitner are the only women to obtain a Habilitation in physics in Germany before World War II.

==== 1930s ====
- 1931: Sylvia Skan and Victor Montague Falkner publish their work on the Falkner–Skan boundary layer.
- 1931: Toshiko Yuasa becomes the first Japanese female physicist.
- 1932: Mathematician Marie-Louise Dubreil-Jacotin introduces an equation to describe internal waves. Robert R. Long later popularizes the equation, now called the Dubreil-Jacotin–Long equation.
- 1933: Gertrud Pöschl, working with Edward Teller, finds that the Pöschl–Teller potential is analytically solvable in quantum mechanics.
- 1934: Olga N. Trapeznikowa and her husband Lev Shubnikov finish an experiment showing one of the first evidences for the existence of antiferromagnetism.
- 1934: Irène Joliot-Curie and her husband Frédéric discover positron emission and induced radioactivity.
- 1935:
  - Katharine Burr Blodgett improves Irving Langmuir's experimental set up leading to the development of the Langmuir–Blodgett trough and the discovery of the Langmuir–Blodgett films.
  - Melba Phillips, first doctorate student of J. Robert Oppenheimer, publishes a paper about a type of deuteron reaction, now known as the Oppenheimer–Phillips process.
  - Grete Hermann provides the earliest refutation to John von Neumann's attempt to prove that quantum mechanics is incompatible with hidden variables.
  - Alice Leigh-Smith becomes the first woman in Great Britain to obtain a PhD in nuclear physics.
- 1936: Hertha Sponer becomes the first female professor in the physics faculty in Duke University.
- 1936: Anna Keesom and his father Willem Hendrik Keesom discover that the thermal conduction of helium-4 below 2.2 K was extremely large. Hinting at superfluidity.
- 1937: Marietta Blau and her student Hertha Wambacher, both Austrian physicists, receive the Lieben Prize of the Austrian Academy of Sciences for their work on cosmic ray observations using the technique of nuclear emulsions.
- 1938: Tatiana Kontorova, in collaboration with Yakov Frenkel, develops the Frenkel-Kontorova model to describe the structure and nonlinear dynamics of a crystal lattice in the vicinity of the dislocation core.
- 1939
  - Lise Meitner helps lead a small group of scientists who first discover the nuclear fission of uranium when it absorbs an extra neutron.
  - Nuclear physicist Marguerite Perey discovers francium.
  - Sameera Moussa becomes the first woman to earn a doctorate in atomic radiation and the first woman to hold a teaching post in Cairo University.
- 1939–1942: Bibha Chowdhuri, working with Debendra Mohan Bose, recovers the first evidence of mesons, 200 heavier than the electron.

==== 1940s ====
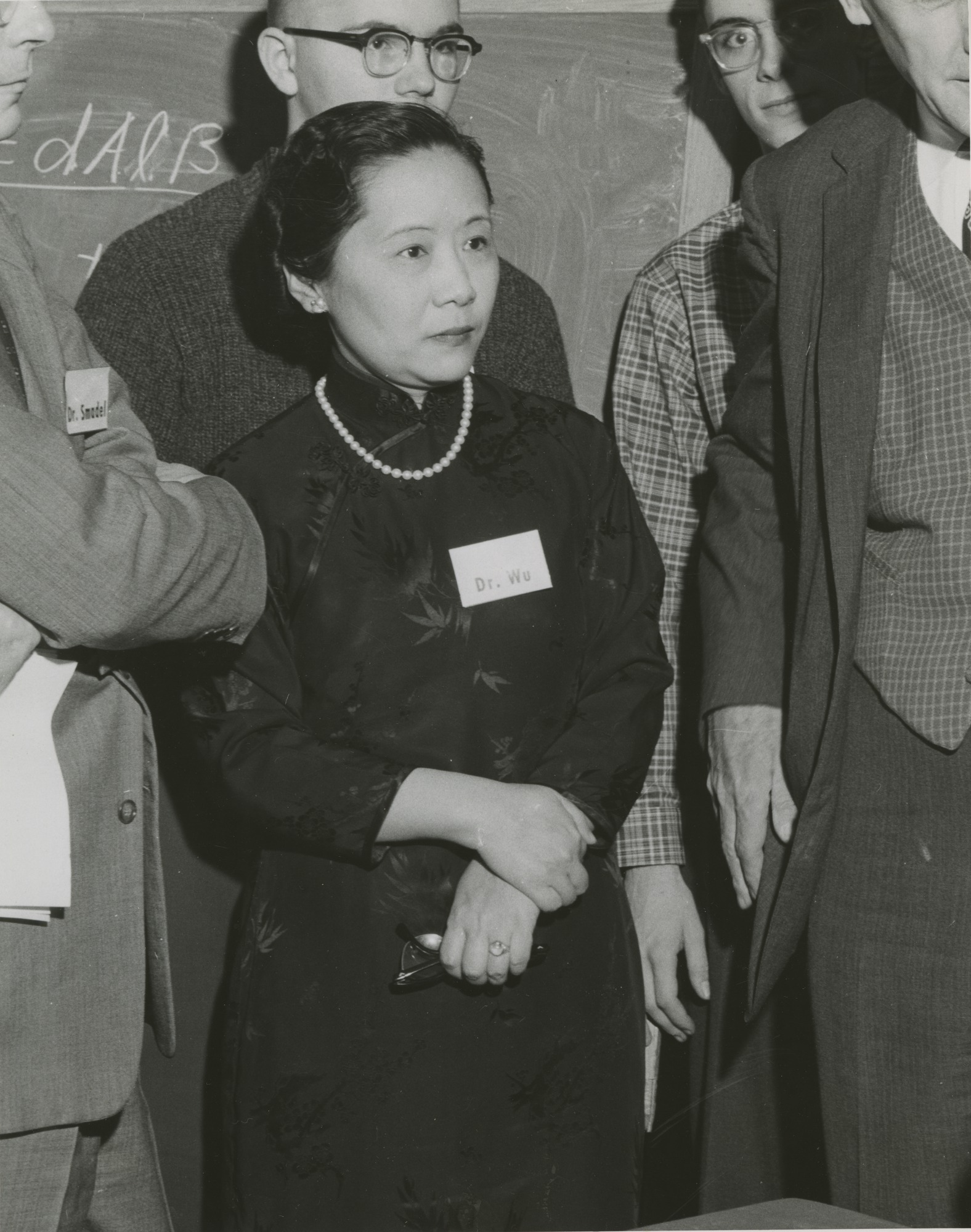
Chien-Shiung Wu known for the Wu experiment that established the non conservation of parity symmetry in particle physics.

- c. 1940: Elizabeth Alexander and Ruby Payne-Scott become the first women to work in radio astronomy, making important results on the study of radar signals coming from the sun.
- 1941: Ruby Payne-Scott joins the Radio Physics Laboratory of the Australia Government's CSIRO; she was the first woman radio astronomer.
- 1942: Gertrude Scharff Goldhaber first demonstrates that the spontaneous fission of uranium also releases multiple neutrons. The neutron yield is high enough to sustain a chain reaction.
- 1942: The world's first human-made nuclear reactor, Chicago Pile-1 led by Enrico Fermi, reaches criticality. Leona Woods is the only woman in the team and she is instrumental in the construction and then use of Geiger counters for analysis during experimentation.
- 1943: The Manhattan project hires the Calutron Girls, a group of about 10,000 young women, to monitor dials and watch meters for calutrons, mass spectrometers adapted for separation of uranium isotopes, unaware of the purpose of the project.
- 1943: Berta Karlik and Traude Bernert discover astatine as a product of two naturally occurring decay chains. Karlik is awarded the Haitinger Prize from the Austrian Academy of Sciences for this discovery.
- 1944: Curium (atomic number 96, symbol Cm) is discovered and named after Marie and Pierre Curie; the "m" in Cm is a reference to Marie.
- 1945: American physicists and mathematicians Frances Spence, Ruth Teitelbaum, Marlyn Meltzer, Betty Holberton, Jean Bartik and Kathleen Antonelli program the electronic general-purpose computer ENIAC, becoming some of the world's first computer programmers.
- 1945: Physicist Elizabeth Monroe Boggs, known for her work in statistical physics and in the Manhattan Project, leaves academia to become an advocate for people with developmental disabilities.
- 1947: Hilda Hänchen, in collaboration with Fritz Goos, demonstrates a new optical phenomena, now known as the Goos–Hänchen effect.
- 1948:
  - Phyllis S. Freier's PhD thesis, along with the work of her colleagues Edward J. Lofgren, Edward P. Ney, and Frank Oppenheimer, demonstrates the presence of heavy nuclei in cosmic radiation.
  - Sonja Ashauer becomes the first woman to earn a PhD in physics in Brazil, under the supervision of Paul Dirac. Her thesis focuses on early problems related to what would become quantum electrodynamics.
  - Katharine Way, in collaboration with Eugene Wigner, comes up with an empirical formula for decay heat, now known as Way–Wigner formula.
- 1949: Rosemary Brown (later Fowler), a student of C.F. Powell at the University of Bristol, discovers the k-meson in what Heisenberg calls the "most beautiful" pictures of cosmic ray tracks from the Jungfraujoch (the 'k' track in Brown, R. et al. Nature, 163, 47 (1949). This discovery and the prior finding of a very similar particle in 1947 lead to the "τ–θ puzzle", the discovery of parity violation in weak interactions, and hence the Standard Model.
- 1949: Maria Goeppert Mayer submits work for publication that explains nuclear magic numbers based on the nuclear shell model with the addition of spin–orbit interaction.
- 1949: Inga Fischer-Hjalmars, jointly with Charles Coulson, develops Coulson–Fischer theory for molecular physics.
- 1950: Avril Rhys, jointly with Huang Kun, publishes the formula for the emission of phonons under electronic interactions in defects. This formula is now known as the Huang–Rhys factor.

==== 1950s ====
- 1951: Cécile DeWitt-Morette founds the École de physique des Houches, a prestigious summer school for international physics in Europe.
- 1952: Photograph 51, an X-ray diffraction image of crystallized DNA, is taken by Raymond Gosling in May 1952, working as a PhD student under the supervision of British chemist and biophysicist Rosalind Franklin; it becomes critical evidence in identifying the structure of DNA.
- 1952: Yvonne Choquet-Bruhat proves that Einstein field equations can be formulated as an initial value problem (local existence of solutions and uniqueness).
- 1953
  - Authors including Arianna W. Rosenbluth and Augusta H. Teller, led by Nicholas Metropolis, write the paper titled "Equation of State Calculations by Fast Computing Machines" that introduces the Metropolis–Hastings algorithm.
  - Rose Morton and William L. Haberman identify a constant to characterize bubbles. The constant is now called the Morton number.
  - Katharine Way establishes and leads the Nuclear Data Project (NDP) at the National Bureau of Standards (project now part of Brookhaven National Laboratory's National Nuclear Data Center).
- 1954: Janine Connes pioneers the new field of Fourier transform infrared spectroscopy for astronomy.
- 1954: Sulamith Goldhaber, along with her husband Gerson Goldhaber, starts a series of important experiments to measure the properties of the K meson.
- 1955: The results of the Fermi–Pasta–Ulam–Tsingou simulation is published in Los Alamos National Laboratory. It is coded by Mary Tsingou using the MANIAC I computer working with Enrico Fermi, John Pasta, and Stanislaw Ulam in the Manhattan Project. It represents one of the first computational experiments in mathematics and chaos theory.
- 1956: Chinese-American physicist Chien-Shiung Wu conducts a nuclear physics experiment in collaboration with the Low Temperature Group of the US National Bureau of Standards. The experiment, which becomes known as the Wu experiment, shows that parity could be violated in weak interaction.
- 1957: Margaret Burbidge releases the landmark B2FH paper as first author along with Geoffrey Burbidge, William A. Fowler, and Fred Hoyle. The paper reviews stellar nucleosynthesis theory and identified nucleosynthesis processes that are responsible for producing the elements heavier than iron and explains their relative abundances.
- 1958: Olga Ladyzhenskaya provides the first rigorous proofs of the convergence of a finite difference method for the Navier–Stokes equations.
- 1958: Xie Xide publishes the first book on semiconductor theory in China and establishes modern institutes on the topic. She is later sent to prison during the Cultural Revolution.
- 1960: American medical physicist Rosalyn Yalow receives the Nobel Prize in Physiology or Medicine "for the development of radioimmunoassays of peptide hormones" along with Roger Guillemin and Andrew V. Schally who receive it "for their discoveries concerning the peptide hormone production of the brain".

==== 1960s ====
- 1961: Ellen Fetter and Margaret Hamilton are collaborators with Edward Norton Lorenz in weather forecasting, establishing tmodern chaos theory.
- 1961: Nina Byers, jointly with C.N. Yang, studies the quantum Hall effect. Together they prove the Byers–Yang theorem.
- 1962: French physicist Marguerite Perey becomes the first female Fellow elected to the Académie des Sciences.
- 1963: Maria Goeppert Mayer becomes the first American woman to receive a Nobel Prize in Physics; she shares the prize with J. Hans D. Jensen "for their discoveries concerning nuclear shell structure" and Eugene Paul Wigner "for his contributions to the theory of the atomic nucleus and the elementary particles, particularly through the discovery and application of fundamental symmetry principles".
- 1963: Experiments by Myriam Sarachik provide the first data that confirm the Kondo effect.
- 1964: Chien-Shiung Wu speaks at MIT about gender discrimination.
- 1967: Astrophysicist Jocelyn Bell Burnell co-discovers the first radio pulsars.
- 1967: Helen Freedhoff becomes the first female professor at York University.
- 1969: Helen Hopfield develops the Hopfield model to study the troposphere and satellite-tracking.
- 1970: Astronomer Vera Rubin publishes the first evidence for dark matter.
- 1970: Madeleine Veyssié, coins the term soft matter.

==== 1970s ====
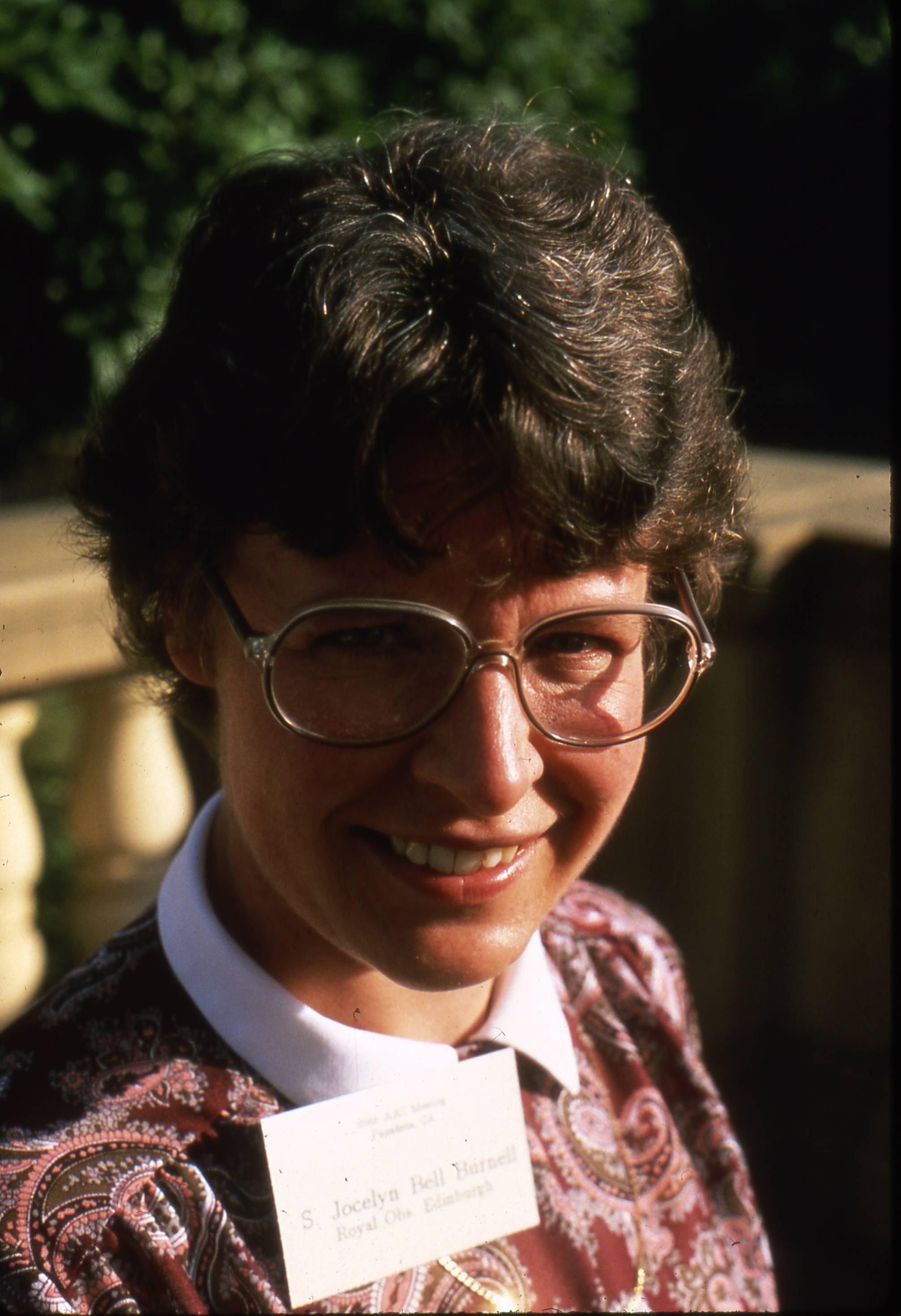
Jocelyn Bell Burnell known for the discovery of radio pulsars

- 1971: Mina Rees becomes the first woman president of American Association for the Advancement of Science (AAAS) since its founding in 1848.
- 1971: Daphne Jackson at the University of Surrey becomes the first female physics professor in the United Kingdom.
- 1972:
  - Willie Hobbs Moore becomes the first African-American woman to receive a Ph.D. in physics.
  - Sandra Faber becomes the first woman to join the Lick Observatory staff at the University of California, Santa Cruz.
  - After her position at University of Massachusetts Boston is terminated in 1968, purportedly due to university anti-nepotism policies (her husband was also a professor), Freda Friedman Salzman is reappointed and eventually gains tenure.
- 1973: American physicist Anna Coble becomes the first African-American woman to receive a PhD in biophysics, completing her dissertation at University of Illinois.
- 1975: Mary K. Gaillard, working with Benjamin W. Lee and Jonathan L. Rosner, predicts the mass of the charm quark before it is ever measured. She later predicts the mass of the bottom quark.
- 1975: María Teresa Ruiz, becomes the first woman to obtain a PhD in astrophysics at Princeton University.
- 1976: Sandra Faber publishes her Faber–Jackson relation, providing the first empirical power-law relation between the luminosity and the central stellar velocity dispersion of elliptical galaxy.
- 1977: Helen Quinn develops the Peccei–Quinn theory as one of the first possible solutions to the strong CP problem, in collaboration with Roberto Peccei.
- 1978: Chien-Shiung Wu becomes the inaugural laureate of the Wolf Prize in Physics for her help with the development of the Standard Model.
- 1978: Inga Fischer-Hjalmars becomes the first woman to earn full professorship in theoretical physics in Sweden, replacing Oskar Klein at KTH Royal Institute of Technology.
- 1979: Sau Lan Wu, working alongside Paul Söding, Björn Wiik and Günter Wolf, finds evidence for three-jet events in e^{+}e^{-} collision in the Positron–Electron Tandem Ring Accelerator (PETRA) at DESY, leading to the confirmation of the existence of the gluon. The 4 collaborators receive the 1995 High Energy and Particle Physics Prize of European Physical Society for this discovery.
- 1980: Nigerian geophysicist Deborah Ajakaiye becomes the first woman in any West African country to be appointed a full professor of physics. Over the course of her scientific career, she becomes the first female Fellow elected to the Nigerian Academy of Science, and the first female dean of science in Nigeria.
- 1980: Mary K. Gaillard produces a report at CERN (European Organization for Nuclear Research) addressing the fact that just 3% of the staff are women. She calls for the elimination of gender discrimination through equality in promotion, maternity leave and full-day child care.

==== 1980s ====
- 1981: Mary K. Gaillard becomes the first woman with a tenured position in the physics faculty at the University of California, Berkeley.
- 1985: Mildred Dresselhaus is appointed the first women Institute Professor at MIT
- 1985: Donna Strickland, jointly with Gérard Mourou, introduces chirped pulse amplification.
- 1986: Maria Goeppert Mayer Award is awarded for the first time to honor young female physicists at the beginning of their careers.
- 1986 Jean M. Bennett becomes the first woman president of The Optical Society since its founding in 1916.
- 1990: Anamaría Font, jointly with Luis E. Ibáñez, Dieter Lüst and Fernando Quevedo, introduces S-duality in string theory.

==== 1990s ====
- 1991: Ana María López, graduate student of Eduardo Fradkin, develops the first Chern–Simons theory for composite fermions to explain the fractional quantum Hall effect.
- 1992: Claudine Hermann is first woman to be appointed professor at École Polytechnique.
- 1995: Reva Williams works out the Penrose process for rotating black holes.
- 1997: The chemical element with the atomic number 278 is officially named meitnerium, after Lise Meitner.
- 1999: Lisa Randall publishes the Randall–Sundrum model, with Raman Sundrum.
- 1999: The International Union of Pure and Applied Physics (IUPAP) creates the Working Group on Women in Physics, with a goal of improving circumstances for women in physics.
- 2000
  - Mildred Dresselhaus becomes the director of the Office of Science at the United States Department of Energy.
  - Helen Quinn becomes the first woman to receive the Dirac Medal of the International Centre for Theoretical Physics (ICTP) "pioneering contributions to the quest for a unified theory of quarks and leptons and the strong, weak and electromagnetic interactions."
  - Valerie Coffman, working with Joydip Kundu and William Wootters, establishes the concept of monogamy of entanglement for tripartite systems, using their Coffman–Kundu–Wooters inequality.

=== 21st century ===
==== 2000s ====
- 2001: Lene Hau, Harvard physics professor, stops a light pulse and starts it again a small distance away, a "milestone in light manipulation."
- 2001: Wendy Freedman and her team publish the measured Hubble constant from measurements of the Hubble Space Telescope.
- 2003:
  - Geophysicist Claudia Alexander oversees the final stages of Project Galileo, a space exploration mission that ends at the planet Jupiter.
  - Deborah S. Jin and her team are the first to condense pairs of fermionic atoms.
  - Physicists Ayşe Erzan, Karimat El-Sayed, Li Fanghua, Mariana Weissmann and Anneke Levelt Sengers win the first L'Oréal-UNESCO For Women in Science Awards in Physical Sciences.
  - Renata Kallosh, in collaboration with Shamit Kachru, Andrei Linde, and Sandip Trivedi, proposes the KKLT mechanism in string theory.
- 2005: Myriam Sarachik becomes the first woman to win the Oliver E. Buckley Condensed Matter Prize for her contributions to quantum spin dynamics and spin coherence in condensed matter systems, along with David Awschalom and Gabriel Aeppli.
- 2007: Physicist Ibtesam Badhrees is the first Saudi Arabian woman to become a member of the European Organization for Nuclear Research (CERN).
- 2009: Margaret Reid becomes the first woman to win the Moyal Medal from Macquarie University, for her work demonstrating the Einstein-Podolsky-Rosen paradox using squeezing and parametric down conversion.

==== 2010s ====
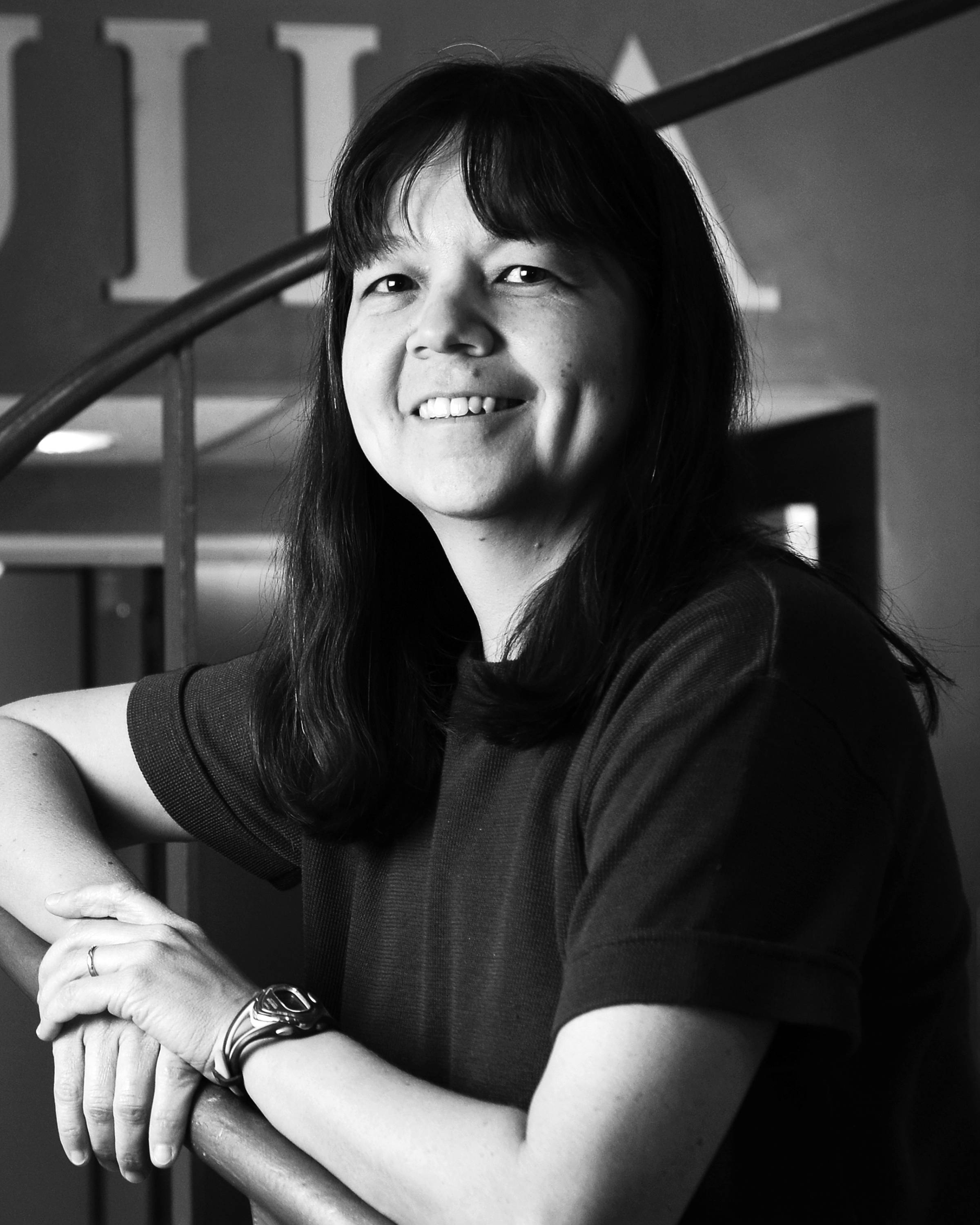
Deborah S. Jin known for creating the first fermionic condensate

- 2011: Taiwanese-American astrophysicist Chung-Pei Ma leasd a team of scientists in discovering two of the largest black holes ever observed.
- 2012: Mildred Dresselhaus becomes the first female laureate of the Kavli Prize in Nanosciences "for her pioneering contributions to the study of phonons, electron-phonon interactions, and thermal transport in nanostructures".
- 2012: Andrea Ghez becomes the first woman to receive the Crafoord Prize of the Royal Swedish Academy of Sciences.
- 2013: Nashwa Eassa founded the NGO Sudanese Women in Sciences.
- 2014: American theoretical physicist Shirley Anne Jackson is awarded the National Medal of Science. Jackson is also the first African-American woman to receive a PhD from MIT in the early 1970s, and the first woman to chair the U.S. Nuclear Regulatory Commission.
- 2014: Amanda Barnard becomes the first woman to win the Feynman Prize in Nanotechnology for her computational simulations on diamond nanoparticles.
- 2016: Fabiola Gianotti becomes the first woman Director-General of CERN (European Organization for Nuclear Research)
- 2018:
  - Astrophysicists Hiranya Peiris and Joanna Dunkley and Italian cosmologist Licia Verde are among 27 scientists awarded the Breakthrough Prize in Fundamental Physics for their contributions to "detailed maps of the early universe that greatly improved our knowledge of the evolution of the cosmos and the fluctuations that seeded the formation of galaxies".
  - Astrophysicist Jocelyn Bell Burnell receives the special Breakthrough Prize in Fundamental Physics for her scientific achievements and "inspiring leadership", worth $3 million. She donates the entirety of the prize money towards the creation of scholarships to assist women, underrepresented minorities and refugees who are pursuing the study of physics.
  - Physicist Donna Strickland receives the Nobel Prize in Physics "for groundbreaking inventions in the field of laser physics"; she shares it with Arthur Ashkin and Gérard Mourou.
  - For the first time in history, women receive the Nobel Prize in Chemistry and the Nobel Prize in Physics in the same year.
  - Human rights activist and physicist Narges Mohammadi wins the Andrei Sakharov prize by the American Physical Society, "for her leadership in campaigning for peace, justice, and the abolition of the death penalty and for her unwavering efforts to promote the human rights and freedoms of the Iranian people, despite persecution that has forced her to suspend her scientific pursuits and endure lengthy incarceration."
  - Ewine van Dishoeck becomes the first female laureate of the Kavli Prize in Astrophysics for "her combined contributions to observational, theoretical, and laboratory astrochemistry, elucidating the life cycle of interstellar clouds and the formation of stars and planets"
- 2019: Mathematician Karen Uhlenbeck becomes the first woman to win the Abel Prize for "her pioneering achievements in geometric partial differential equations, gauge theory, and integrable systems, and for the fundamental impact of her work on analysis, geometry and mathematical physics."
- 2019: The first direct image of a black hole and its vicinity is published, following observations made by the Event Horizon Telescope (EHT) of the supermassive black hole in Messier 87's galactic centre. One of the two teams is led by Andrea Ghez.
- 2020:
  - Andrea M. Ghez receives the Nobel Prize in Physics "for the discovery of a supermassive compact object at the centre of our galaxy." She shares half of the prize with Reinhard Genzel, while the other half is awarded to Roger Penrose.
  - Geoscientist Ingeborg Levin is the first woman to receive the Alfred Wegener medal from the European Geosciences Union "for fundamental contributions to our present knowledge and understanding of greenhouse gases in the atmosphere, including the global carbon cycle."
  - Françoise Combes becomes the first female astrophysicist to win the CNRS Gold Medal, the French government's highest honor in scientific research.

==== 2020s ====
- 2022: Anne L'Huillier becomes the second female scientist to receive the Wolf Prize in Physics "for pioneering contributions to ultrafast laser science and attosecond physics".
- 2022: Astronomer Ewine van Dishoeck is awarded the UNESCO Niels Bohr Medal.
- 2023: Professor Polina Bayvel becomes the first woman to win the Rumford Medal by the Royal Society.
- 2023: Anne l'Huillier receives the 2023 Nobel Prize in Physics for "experimental methods that generate attosecond pulses of light for the study of electron dynamics in matter" shared with Pierre Agostini and Ferenc Krausz.
- 2023: While in prison, Narges Mohammadi receives the 2023 Nobel Peace Prize "for her fight against the oppression of women in Iran and her fight to promote human rights and freedom for all".
- 2024: Marcela Carena becomes the first woman executive director of the Perimeter Institute for Theoretical Physics.
- 2025: Julia Yeomans becomes the first female laureate of the Dirac Medal of the Institute of Physics.
- 2026: Jacqueline Bloch becomes the first female physicist to earn the CNRS Gold Medal.

== See also ==
- List of women associated with Marie Curie and Irène Joliot-Curie
- Timeline of women in science
- Timeline of women in science in the United States
- Women in NASA
- Women in science
- Women in the workforce
