= Birge =

Birge may refer to

== People ==
- Jean-Jacques Birgé (born 1952), French composer
- Jodle Birge (1945–2004), Danish composer and singer
- John Birges (1922–1996), Mastermind of Harvey's Resort Hotel bombing
- June Bingham Birge (1919–2007), American author and playwright
- Birge Clark (1893–1989), American architect
- Raymond Thayer Birge (1887–1980), American physicist
- Edward Bailey Birge (1868–1952), American music educator
- L. Birge Harrison (1854–1929), American genre and landscape painter
- Edward Asahel Birge (1851–1950), President of the University of Wisconsin
- Henry Warner Birge (1825–1888), Union Army general during the American Civil War.
- Lucien Birgé (born 1950), French mathematician at the University Pierre et Marie Curie in Paris

== Other ==
- Birge–Sponer method, A calculation method in molecular spectroscopy
- Birge-Horton House, Historic home in Buffalo, New York
- Birge Mills, Ontario, A community in Ontario, Canada
