= Quercus baronii =

Conservation status
- Least Concern (IUCN 3.1)

Scientific classification
- Kingdom: Plantae
- Clade: Embryophytes
- Clade: Tracheophytes
- Clade: Spermatophytes
- Clade: Angiosperms
- Clade: Eudicots
- Clade: Rosids
- Order: Fagales
- Family: Fagaceae
- Genus: Quercus
- Subgenus: Quercus subg. Cerris
- Section: Quercus sect. Ilex
- Species: Q. baronii

Binomial name
- Quercus baronii Skan

Synonyms
- Quercus baronii f. capillata Kozlov; Quercus baronii var. capillata (Kozlov) Liou; Quercus baronii var. pendula S.Y.Wang & C.L.Chang; Quercus dielsiana Seemen; Quercus kozloviana Liou; Quercus pseudoserrata Liou

Species of flowering plant

Quercus baronii is a species of oak, It is a tree native to central and southern China, including Henan, Shaanxi, Shanxi, Hunan, Gansu, and Sichuan provinces. It is a semi-evergreen shrub or tree up to 15 metres tall. It grows in subtropical and temperate mixed mesophytic forests, often on limestone, from 500 to 2,200 metres elevation.

The species was described by Sidney Alfred Skan in 1899.
