= Quercus blakei =

Conservation status
- Least Concern (IUCN 3.1)

Scientific classification
- Kingdom: Plantae
- Clade: Embryophytes
- Clade: Tracheophytes
- Clade: Spermatophytes
- Clade: Angiosperms
- Clade: Eudicots
- Clade: Rosids
- Order: Fagales
- Family: Fagaceae
- Genus: Quercus
- Subgenus: Quercus subg. Cerris
- Section: Quercus sect. Cyclobalanopsis
- Species: Q. blakei

Binomial name
- Quercus blakei Skan

Synonyms
- Cyclobalanopsis blakei (Skan) Schottky; Quercus blackei S.C.Lee; Quercus blakei var. parvifolia Merr.; Quercus patkoiensis A.Camus

Species of oak tree

Quercus blakei is an uncommon species of tree in the beech family Fagaceae. It is native to Laos and Vietnam in Indochina, Guangdong, Guangxi, Guizhou, and Hainan provinces of southern China, and northeastern India. It is placed in subgenus Cerris, section Cyclobalanopsis.

== Description ==
Quercus blakei is a tree up to 35 m. tall, with leaves as much as 190 mm long. The acorns are ellipsoid to ovoid, 25-35 × 15–30 mm with a flat to depressed scar 7–11 mm in diameter. The cupules are shallow-bowl-shaped, 5-10 × 20–30 mm, covering base of acorn, with bracts in 6 or 7 rings, margin entire or dentate. In China, flowering occurs in March and acorns ca be found from October–December.
