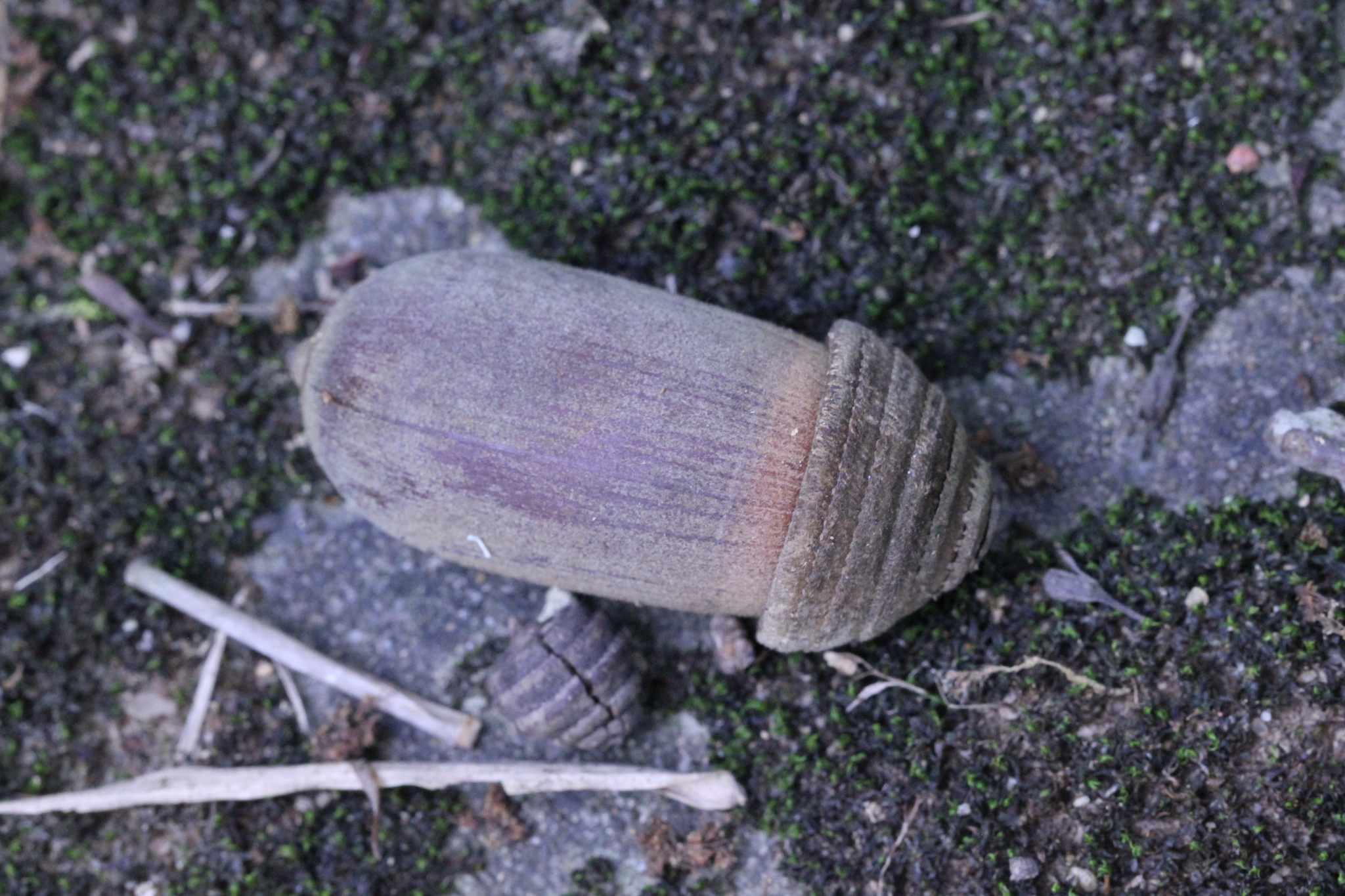

Conservation status
- Endangered (IUCN 3.1)

Scientific classification
- Kingdom: Plantae
- Clade: Embryophytes
- Clade: Tracheophytes
- Clade: Spermatophytes
- Clade: Angiosperms
- Clade: Eudicots
- Clade: Rosids
- Order: Fagales
- Family: Fagaceae
- Genus: Quercus
- Subgenus: Quercus subg. Cerris
- Section: Quercus sect. Cyclobalanopsis
- Species: Q. edithiae

Binomial name
- Quercus edithiae Skan (1900)

Synonyms
- Cyclobalanopsis edithiae (Skan) Schottky; Quercus tephrosia Chun & W.C.Ko

= Quercus edithiae =

Species of oak tree

Quercus edithiae is a species of tree in the family Fagaceae and the "ring-cupped oak" sub-genus. It is native to Vietnam and southern China (Guangdong, Guangxi, and Hainan) and Hong Kong. In Vietnam it is called sồi editha. It is placed in subgenus Cerris, section Cyclobalanopsis.

Quercus edithiae is a tree up to 20 m. tall with hairless twigs. The leathery leaves are glabrous, oblong-elliptic to obovate, 50-160 × 20–60 mm, with a 20–30 mm petiole. The acorn is ellipsoid to cylindric-ellipsoid, 30-45 × 20–30 mm, with a scar approx. 7 mm in diameter.
