= Quercus augustinei =

Conservation status
- Least Concern (IUCN 3.1)

Scientific classification
- Kingdom: Plantae
- Clade: Embryophytes
- Clade: Tracheophytes
- Clade: Spermatophytes
- Clade: Angiosperms
- Clade: Eudicots
- Clade: Rosids
- Order: Fagales
- Family: Fagaceae
- Genus: Quercus
- Subgenus: Quercus subg. Cerris
- Section: Quercus sect. Cyclobalanopsis
- Species: Q. augustinei

Binomial name
- Quercus augustinei Skan

Synonyms
- List: Cyclobalanopsis augustinei (Skan) Schottky; Cyclobalanopsis augustinei var. nigrinux (Hu) M.Deng & Z.K.Zhou; Cyclobalanopsis nigrinux Hu; Pasania chiwui Hu; Quercus augustinei var. angustifolia A.Camus; Quercus augustinei var. genuina A.Camus, not validly publ.; Quercus augustinei var. rockiana A.Camus; Quercus glabricupula Barnett

Species of oak tree

Quercus augustinei, spelling corrected from Quercus augustinii, is a rare species of tree in the beech family Fagaceae. It is a shrub or small tree native to Cambodia, Myanmar, Thailand, and Vietnam in Indochina, and to Guangxi, Guizhou, and Yunnan provinces in southern China. It is placed in subgenus Cerris, section Cyclobalanopsis.

== Description ==
Quercus augustinei is a tree up to 10 m tall, with orange-brown twigs and leaves as much as 120 mm long. The acorn is oblong-ovoid, 10–17 × 8–12 mm, glabrous, apex rounded or slightly depressed; scar approx. 6 mm in diameter.

== Taxonomy ==
The species was first described in 1899 by Sidney Alfred Skan. Skan spelt the specific epithet augustinii. This was intended to commemorate the collector, Augustine Henry. Under the International Code of Nomenclature for algae, fungi, and plants, this spelling is not an acceptable Latinization of "Augustine", and was corrected to augustinei. Another possible correction would be augustini.
