= Ibtesam Badhrees =

Saudi Arabian research physicist

- Born: Makkah, Saudi Arabia
- Occupation: Physicist

Ibtesam Saeed Badhrees is a research scientist in experimental particle physics at King Abdulaziz City for Science and Technology (KACST) and a Distinguished Fellow of New Westminster College.

Badhrees is the first Saudi woman member of CERN. In addition, she is the first Saudi female PhD holder to work in the National Center for Mathematics and Physics in King Abdulaziz City for Science and Technology. Her research areas are in Experimental Elementary Particle Physics, Astrophysics, Medical Physics and Nuclear Physics. In addition, Badhrees acts as an adjunct professor at Carleton University in Canada

== Biography ==
Badhrees was born and brought up in Jeddah, Saudi Arabia. She graduated with a Bachelor of Science in Physics from King Abdulaziz University in 1990 and then earned a Master of Science in Applied Physics/Laser from Fairleigh Dickinson University in 1997. She finished her PhD in Particle Physics from University of Bern in 2011. She also holds a PhD in International Relations from the Geneva School of Diplomacy and International Relations. She was the recipient of the Saudi Cultural Mission academic excellence award in 1996, 1997, 2007 and was named the "Woman Physicist of the Month" for August 2014 by the American Physical Society She speaks Arabic, English and French.

== Awards and recognition ==
- Saudi Arabian Cultural Mission Academic Excellence Award, United States, 1996–1997.
- Saudi Arabian Cultural Mission Academic Excellence Award, Europe, 2007.
- CERN, as the first Saudi woman join the organization as a user researcher.
- "CERN opens its doors to its first collaborators from Saudi Arabia". CERN Courier. 47 (2): 38. March 2007.
- Alsharaq Alawsat Journal, 2008.
- Saiduty Magazine, 2008.
- MBC, Saudi Arabia, Egypt, 2008.
- MBC, Saudi Arabia, Lebanon, 2009.
- Madame Figaro, 2009.
- Laha Magazine, As one of distinctive women in Saudi Arabia, 2013.

== See also ==
- Timeline of women in science
- Women in physics
