= Hertha Sponer =

German physicist and chemist (1895–1968)

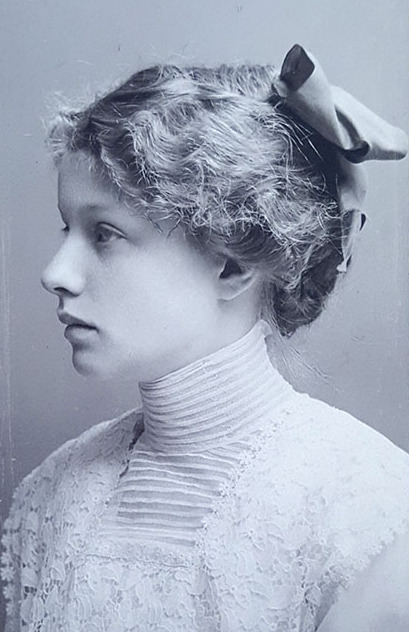
- Hertha Sponer in 1913
- Born: 1 September 1895; Neisse, German Empire
- Died: 27 February 1968 (aged 72); Ilten, West Germany
- Education: University of Göttingen
- Known for: Birge–Sponer method
- Awards: 1952–53 Guggenheim Fellow; Fellow, New York Academy of Sciences; Fellow, Optical Society of America; Fellow, American Physical Society.
- Scientific career
- Fields: Physics
- Workplaces: University of Jena; Duke University
- Thesis: Über ultrarote Absorption zweiatomiger Gase
- Doctoral advisor: Peter Debye

Hertha Dorthea Elisabeth Sponer (1 September 1895 – 27 February 1968) was a German physicist and chemist who contributed to modern quantum mechanics and molecular physics. She was the first woman on the physics faculty of Duke University and was one of only three women to earn both a PhD in Physics and habilitation in Germany before the start of World War II, the others being Lise Meitner and Hedwig Kohn. Her younger sister was philologist and resistance fighter Margot Sponer.

== Life and career ==
=== Early life and education ===
Sponer was born in Neisse (Nysa), Prussian Silesia, in 1895 and was the eldest of children to Robert Franz Sponer, a stationary merchant, and Elizabeth Helene Ottilie Heerde. Her younger sister was Margot Sponer. Sponer attended primary and the start of secondary school in Neisse, before her family moved to Zittau in Saxony. She completed her high school education in a mix of private instruction, boarding school, and secondary school in Zittau. She also earned certification as a governess in 1913 and worked as a substitute elementary school teacher during World War I. In 1917, Sponer passed the Abitur qualification, allowing her to enroll in university to study physics.

She spent a year at the University of Tübingen, taking classes with Friedrich Paschen, where she was first exposed to the field of Spectroscopy. She then enrolled at the University of Göttingen where she received her PhD in 1920 under the supervision of Peter Debye. Her dissertation was titled "Über ultrarote Absorption zweiatomiger Gase". In her last semester as a graduate student, she was appointed as an aide to mathematician David Hilbert to read and discuss theoretical physics papers with him. He then served as an examiner on her oral examination in March 1920.

=== Career ===
After obtaining her doctorate, Sponer spent a year working at the Kaiser Wilhelm Institute for Physical Chemistry, where she first collaborated with James Franck. In 1921 she returned to the University of Göttingen in the position of Assistentin or scientific assistant, at the newly formed Second Institute for Experimental Physics, headed by James Franck. Here she ran the day-to-day operations of the spectroscopy laboratory, managed staff, and taught lab courses while conducting molecular spectroscopy experimental research. In 1925, earned habilitation making her one of the first women to teach physics at a German university. In October 1925 she received a Rockefeller Foundation fellowship to stay at University of California, Berkeley, where she remained for a year. During her time at Berkeley, she collaborated with R. T. Birge, developing what is now called the Birge–Sponer method for determining dissociation energies.

By 1932, Sponer had published around 20 scientific papers in journals such as Nature and Physical Review, and had become an associate professor of physics. In 1933 James Franck resigned and left Göttingen and a year later she was dismissed from her position when Adolf Hitler came to power, due to the Nazis' stigma against women in academia. In 1934 Sponer moved to Oslo to teach at the University of Oslo as a visiting professor, and in 1936 she started her appointment at Duke University where she remained as a professor until 1966 when she became professor emeritus, a position she held until her death in 1968.

During her academic career, Sponer conducted research in quantum mechanics, physics, and chemistry. She authored and published numerous studies, many of which were in collaboration with famous physicists including Edward Teller and Gertrud Nordheim-Pöschl. She made many contributions to science including the application of quantum mechanics to molecular physics and work on the spectra of near ultra-violet absorption. She set up a spectroscopy lab in the physics department of Duke University, which was later moved to its own new building.

Sponer married James Franck in 1946. She died in Ilten, Lower Saxony.

== Selected publications ==
- Sponer, Hertha (1921). "Über die Häufigkeit unelastischer Zusammenstöße von Elektronen mit Quecksilberatomen" [Inelastic Impacts of Electrons with Mercury Atoms]. Zeitschrift für Physik (in German). 7 (1). Springer Science and Business Media LLC: 185–200. Bibcode:1921ZPhy....7..185S. doi:10.1007/bf01332788. ISSN 1434-6001. S2CID 123434850.
- Sponer, H. (1925). "Bemerkungen zum Serienspektrum von Blei und Zinn" [The Series Spectra of Lead and Tin]. Zeitschrift für Physik (in German). 32 (1). Springer Science and Business Media LLC: 19–26. Bibcode:1925ZPhy...32...19S. doi:10.1007/bf01331645. ISSN 1434-6001. S2CID 122138003.
- Franck, J.; Sponer, H.; Teller, E. (1932). "Bemerkungen über Prädissoziationsspektren dreiatomiger Moleküle" [Predissociation Spectra of Triatomic Molecules]. Zeitschrift für Physikalische Chemie (in German). 18B (1): 88–102. doi:10.1515/zpch-1932-1809. ISSN 0942-9352. S2CID 202045840.
- Sponer, H.; Nordheim, G.; Sklar, A. L.; Teller, E. (1939). "Analysis of the Near Ultraviolet Electronic Transition of Benzene". The Journal of Chemical Physics. 7 (4). AIP Publishing: 207–220. Bibcode:1939JChPh...7..207S. doi:10.1063/1.1750419. ISSN 0021-9606.
