= Margot Sponer =

German philologist and resistance fighter (1898–1945)

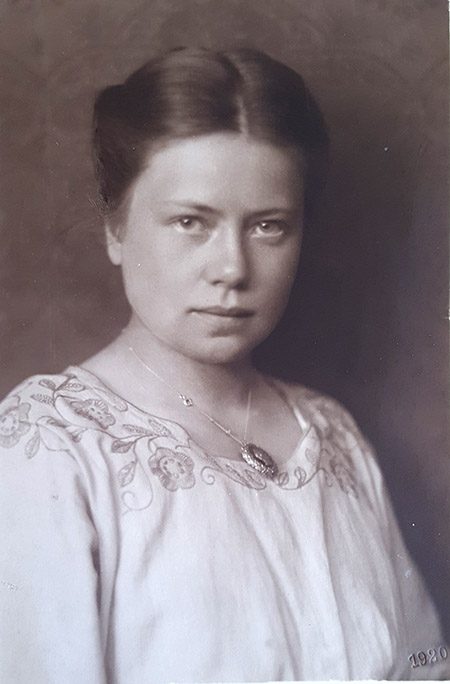
- Sponer in 1920
- Born: 10 February 1898; Neisse, German Empire (present-day Poland)
- Died: 27 April 1945 (aged 47); Berlin, Germany
- Relatives: Hertha Sponer (sister)

Academic background
- Education: Friedrich Wilhelm University
- Thesis: Altgalizische Urkunden (1935)

Academic work
- Discipline: Linguistics
- Sub-discipline: Romance studies
- Institutions: Friedrich Wilhelm University

Margot Sponer (10 February 1898 – 27 April 1945) was a German philologist, teacher, freelance translator, and resistance fighter. She worked as a lecturer of Spanish at Friedrich Wilhelm University from 1929 to 1932, and again from 1937 to 1942. After her dismissal from the university, Sponer worked as a freelance translator while she was active in the resistance to Nazism, using her international contacts to help people escape from government persecution, which she was arrested for in 1942. She reportedly died in 1945 after being dragged out of her home and shot by members of the Schutzstaffel during the Battle of Berlin. She was the younger sister of physicist and chemist Hertha Sponer.

== Biography ==
=== Early life and education ===
Margot Sponer was born 10 February 1898 in Neisse, Silesia, then part of the German Empire, to merchant Robert Franz and Elsabeth Sponer (née Heerde), three years after the birth of her sister Hertha Sponer. In 1919, Sponer finished her secondary education in Quedlinburg, after which she studied Romance and Germanic philology, in addition to Arabic at universities in several cities: Halle, Leipzig, Neapel, Grenoble, Madrid and Berlin.

In April 1929, Sponer started working as an assistant teacher of Spanish at Friedrich Wilhelm University to support herself financially, prepare for exams, and complete her dissertation. She defended her doctoral thesis "Documents in Old Galician" (German: Altgalizische Urkunden) in July 1931. In it, she determined the regions where 156 Galician-language documents from the 10th to 15th century were written, and made them available in a searchable index. The documents were procured from other linguists she encountered in Galicia and Portugal in the Summer and Autumn of 1926.

She left her position as teacher in the winter semester of 1932/1933, and after Nazi seizure of power later that year, she moved to Spain. Little is known about her time in Spain, but in 1934 she is known to have translated one of the lectures of her sister in Madrid. On 20 June 1935, four years after her dissertation, she received her doctorate in Galician philology with magna cum laude while in Spain. Her doctoral advisors were Ernst Gammlscheg and Eduard Wechssler. After the outbreak of the Spanish Civil War in 1936, she moved back to Germany.

=== Academic career ===
During her time in Spain, she published several works on Romance languages in Iberia, including "Catalan dialects" (German: Katalanische Mundarten) distributed through the Institute of Phonetic Research on vinyl records in Berlin in 1931. These were recordings of northern Catalan dialects accompanied by booklets with translations, phonetic transcriptions, and cursory notes on unique linguistic features in the introduction. She further wrote textual criticisms of medieval Hispanic sources, e.g. of Ramon Lull's "Libre de Consolació s’Ermità", written in 1313.

On 26 April 1937, Sponer returned to work at the Faculty of Philosophy at the University in Berlin, where she received a position as lecturer of Spanish. She went on a research trip to Mexico and the United States in 1938. In her report of the trip she wrote of her economic incentives for going, alongside detailed information on the educational system of Mexico, and the statistics on foreigners in the country. It also included a critical assessment of the ruling leftist government.

In 1940, her teaching position was moved to the newly formed Faculty of Foreign Studies. In December later that year, she started working as a substitute teacher of Spanish at the Wirtschaftshochschule Berlin. She went on further research trips to Spain, once in 1940, and again in 1941.

Sponer was dismissed from her position at the university on 1 October 1942 due to her "incompatibility" with the head of the Spanish department of the faculty she was in. The Reich Ministry of Science, Education and Culture sided with the faculty and rejected her appeal. In November, she wrote to the ministry again to have her dismissal rescinded, but this was also rejected.

=== Resistance to Nazism ===
Following her dismissal from the university, Sponer stayed in Berlin and worked as a freelance translator, and was hired intermittently by the foreign ministry of Germany. Meanwhile, she used her international network of contracts to aid those being persecuted by the government. In 1942, she was arrested by the Gestapo for helping Jews escape persecution, though not much is known about the circumstances that led to her arrest.

In her university's archives, it says that she died in February 1945 at Neuengamme concentration camp, but there are no sources that corroborate this. According to eye witness reports, she was dragged out of her home in the Wilmersdorf borough of Berlin and shot dead by members of the Schutzstaffel on 27 April 1945, three days before the Red Army would arrive there during the Battle of Berlin.
