= Licia Verde =

Italian cosmologist and theoretical physicist (born 1971)

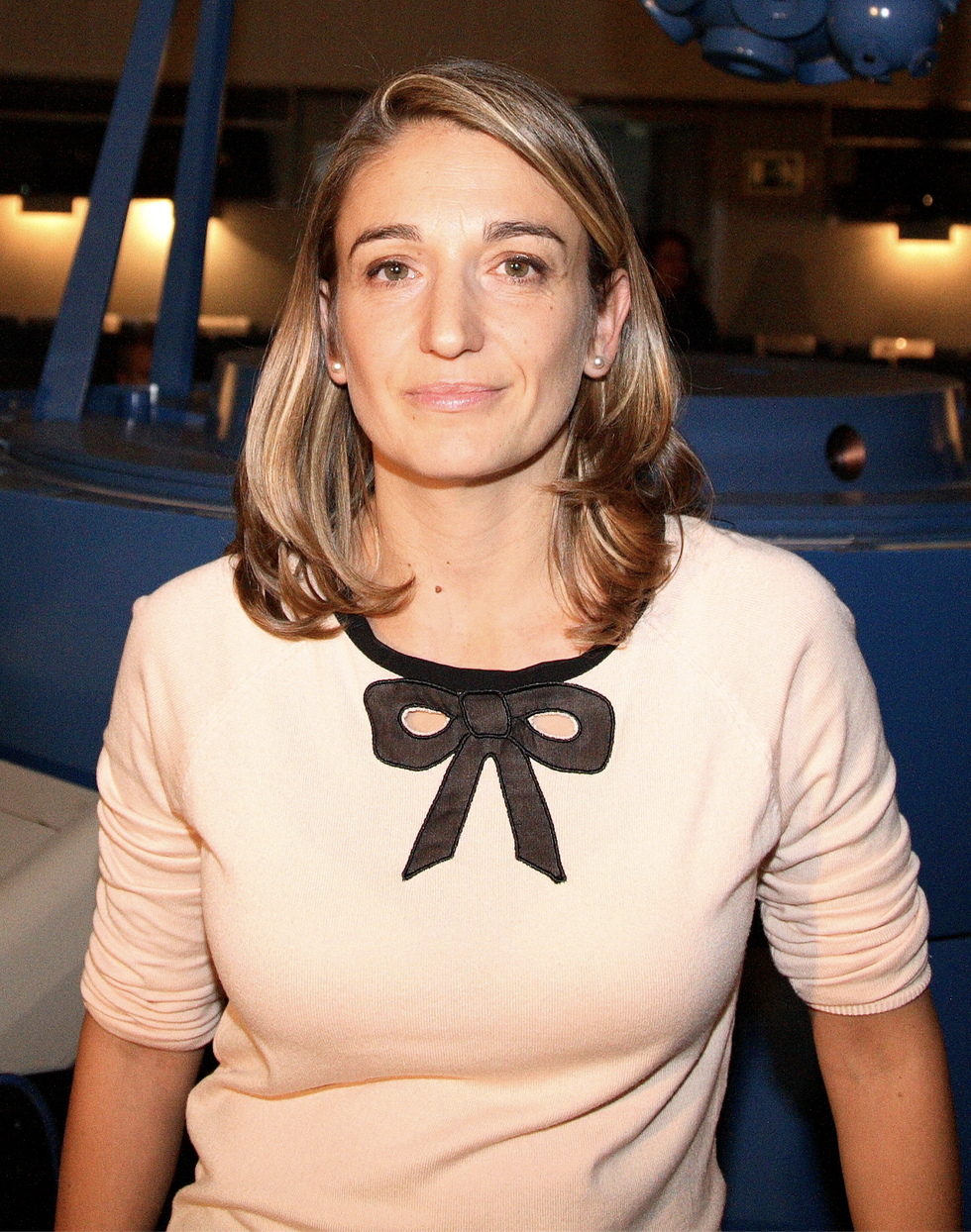
- Born: 14 October 1971 (age 54); Venice, Italy
- Education: University of Padua; University of Edinburgh
- Known for: Cosmic microwave background large-scale structure
- Awards: Gruber Prize in Cosmology (2012); ISI highly cited researcher (2015); European Research Council award (2009, 2016 & 2025); Narcis Monturiol Medal (2018); Breakthrough Prize in Fundamental Physics (2018); National Research Award of Catalonia (2018); European Astronomical Society Lodewijk Woltjer Lecture (2019); Rey Jaime I Awards (2021); Medalla de la Real Sociedad Española de Física (2024); Jocelyn Bell Burnell Inspirational Medal (2025) as part of the arXiv leading team
- Scientific career
- Fields: Cosmology, physics, astrophysics
- Workplaces: University of Edinburgh; Princeton University; University of Pennsylvania; University of Barcelona; University of Oslo; Radcliffe Institute for Advanced Study
- Doctoral advisor: Alan F. Heavens
- Other academic advisors: Sabino Matarrese

Licia Verde (born 14 October 1971, Venice, Italy) is an Italian cosmologist and theoretical physicist and currently ICREA Professor of Physics and Astronomy at the University of Barcelona. Her research interests include large-scale structure, dark matter, dark energy, inflation and the cosmic microwave background.

She received a Laurea degree in 1996 from University of Padua and a PhD in 2000 from the University of Edinburgh, working with Sabino Matarrese and Alan F. Heavens. She did postdoctoral study at Princeton University and joined the faculty of The University of Pennsylvania in 2003. From September 2007, Verde is an ICREA Professor at the ICCUB of the University of Barcelona. She was a Professor II at the University of Oslo during 2013 to 2016. Verde was editor of the Physics of the Dark Universe Journal and is currently scientific director of the Journal of Cosmology and Astroparticle Physics. As of 1 January 2019 she is the chair of the science advisory board of the arXiv.

She is known primarily for work on large-scale structure, analysis of the WMAP data and development of rigorous statistical tools to analyse surveys of the universe. She is a highly cited author.

She appeared in the movie The Laws of Thermodynamics and is featured in the PBS show Closer to Truth in its 2020 season.

== Early life and education ==
Licia Verde was born in Venice, Italy where she grew up. She attended the Liceo classico Marco Polo before she started her undergraduate studies at the University of Padua. She moved to the University of Edinburgh in the fall of 1994, first as an Erasmus and later as a PhD student.

== Career ==
Verde was a research associate at the Dept. of Astrophysical Sciences, Princeton University during 2000 to 2003. In 2003, she joined the faculty of the Physics and Astronomy Dept. of the University of Pennsylvania and remained there until the end of 2007. Since 2008, she is ICREA Professor of Cosmology at the University of Barcelona in Spain. She has also held several faculty visiting positions: Visiting Scholar at the IAS in Princeton, USA (2005); Visiting Senior Research Fellow at the Dept. of Astrophysical Sciences of Princeton University (2007-2009); Scientific Associate at CERN (2012-2013); Professor II of Physics and Astronomy at the University of Oslo (2013-2016) and Radcliffe Fellow at the Radcliffe Institute for Advanced Study, Harvard University (2015-2016). In 2019 she was appointed chair of the science advisory board of the arXiv and in 2020 scientific director of the Journal of Cosmology and Astroparticle Physics.

== Honors and awards ==
- Performance prize from Aldo Gini Foundation (1995)
- Dewar & Ritchie Award from the University of Edinburgh (1996)
- Foundation Blanceflor-Boncompagni Ludovisi née Bildt Award (1997)
- Prize STET Guglielmo Reis Romoli from Gruppo STET (1997)
- Amelia Earhart Award from Zonta International Foundation
- Chandra Fellowship (2002)
- Niels Bohr Lecture (2004) "Cosmology from the Cosmic microwave background and galaxy surveys", Niels Bohr Institute
- NASA Group Achievement Award (2007) for the results of the WMAP mission
- European Research Council (ERC) (2009) ERC starting award
- Svein Rosseland Lecture, "Big questions about the Universe", Oslo University (2012)
- Rosenblum Lecture, "Connecting Cosmology to fundamental physics: examples", Hebrew University (2012)
- Gruber Prize in Cosmology (2012)
- Radcliffe Fellow (2015)
- ISI highly cited researcher (2015)
- European Research Council (2016) ERC Consolidator award
- Narcis Monturiol medal (2018) Medalla Narcis Monturiol.
- Breakthrough Prize in Fundamental Physics (2018) Breakthrough Prize in Fundamental Physics as part of the WMAP team
- National Research Award of Catalonia (2018) (Premi Nacional de Recerca)
- European Astronomical SocietyLodewijk Woltjer Lecture (2019)
- Rey Jaime I Awards (2021) Fundamental Science Award
- Medal of the Spanish Royal Physics Society (2024)
- Jocelyn Bell Burnel Inspiration Medal as part of the arXiv leading team (2025)
- European Research Council (2025) ERC Synergy award RedH0t

== Research ==
Verde analyzed a powerful but challenging statistical property of galaxy surveys related to higher-order correlations. She showed that the galaxy redshift survey conducted with the Anglo-Australian Telescope trace the distribution of dark matter; this result indicated that the galaxy distribution can be used to study the dark matter one.

After she joined the science team of the Microwave Anisotropy Probe, a NASA space mission to map the full sky at radio waves, Verde participated in analysis and interpretation of the Cosmic Microwave Background data from the WMAP satellite.

Verde has been awarded three ERC grants (less than 0.5% of all ERC awardees have achieved three or more ERCs): Cosmological Physics with future large-scale structure surveys (Phys.LSS),, Beyond Precision Cosmology: dealing with Systematic Errors (BePreSyE) and RedTeaming the Hubble Tension (RedH0t). Verde has established a research group in physical cosmology at the University of Barcelona. Under her lead, the group has contributed to results from the Baryon Acoustic Oscillations Survey part of the Sloan Digital Sky Survey: measurements of the expansion history of the universe and the formation of cosmological structures as well as constraint on cosmological parameters describing structure and detailed composition of the cosmos.

The other recent direction of Verde's research is on dark energy. She has developed a model-independent way to study the Universe's expansion history and infer from there the physical properties of dark energy.

== See also ==
- Timeline of women in science
