= Goos–Hänchen effect =

Optical phenomenon

Ray diagram illustrating the physics of the Goos–Hänchen effect

The Goos–Hänchen effect, named after Hermann Fritz Gustav Goos (1883 – 1968) and Hilda Hänchen (1919 – 2013), was first theorized by Isaac Newton (1643 – 1727), and is an optical phenomenon in which a finite-width beam of light undergoes a small lateral shift when totally internally reflected. The shift arises because a bounded beam comprises a continuous distribution of plane wave components with differing wave vectors. The Fresnel reflection coefficients are both polarization and angle dependent, so each plane wave component acquires a different phase shift upon reflection. The superposition of these phase-shifted components displaces the reflected beam's centroid along the interface. The magnitude of the shift is small, and it depends on the beam's polarization state, the wavelength, and the angle of incidence. It is among the most studied non-specular reflection phenomena in optics.

Acoustic analog of the Goos–Hänchen effect is known as Schoch displacement.

== Description ==
This effect occurs because the reflections of plane wave components of a finite-sized beam undergo different phase shifts. A finite-width beam can be expressed as a superposition of plane waves via a Fourier decomposition.

$\psi(x,z) = \frac{1}{\sqrt{2\pi}} \int\limits_{-\infty}^{\infty} \Phi(k_{x})e^{-i[k_{x}x + z\sqrt{(k_{1}^2-k_x^2)}]}dk_{x}$

where $\Phi(k_{x})$ is the angular spectrum of the beam. Each value of $k_{x}$ represents a plane wave in the direction of $k_{x}$. Without loss of generality $k_{1}$ lies in the x-z plane.

Under total internal reflection, each plane-wave component reflects according to the Fresnel equations where $|r(k_{x})|=1$ but acquires a phase shift $\chi(k_{x})$ where

$\chi(k_{x})=-2\tan^{-1}\left[\frac{m(k_{1}^2-k_{x}^2)^{1/2}}{(k_{x}^2-k_{2}^2)^{1/2}}\right]$

with $m=n_2^2/n_1^2$ for the polarization parallel to the plane of incidence and $m=1$ for polarization perpendicular to the plane of incidence. Taylor expanding $\chi(k_x)$ to first order about $k_x=k_1\sin(\theta_i)$ it can be shown that the reflected beam is laterally displaced along the interface by

$\Delta=-{d\chi \over dk_{x}} \bigg |_{k_{x}=k_{1}=\sin(\theta_i)}$

Which is the standard Artmann result.

== Research ==
This effect continues to be a topic of scientific research, for example, in the context of nanophotonics applications. A negative Goos–Hänchen shift was shown by Walter J. Wild and Lee Giles. Sensitive detection of biological molecules is achieved based on measuring the Goos–Hänchen shift, where the signal of lateral change is in a linear relation with the concentration of target molecules. The work by M. Merano et al. studied the Goos–Hänchen effect experimentally for the case of an optical beam reflecting from a metal surface (gold) at 826 nm. They report a substantial negative lateral shift of the reflected beam in the plane of incidence for a p polarization and a smaller positive shift for the s polarization case.

== Generation of giant Goos–Hänchen shift ==
It is known that the value of lateral position Goos–Hänchen shift is only 5–10 μm at a total internal reflection interface of water and air, which is very difficult to be experimentally measured. In order to generate a giant Goos–Hänchen shift up to 100 μm, surface plasmon resonance techniques were applied based on an interface between metal and dielectric. The electrons on the metallic surface are strongly resonant with the optical waves under specific excitation condition. The light has been fully absorbed by the metallic nanostructures, creating an extreme dark point the resonance angle. Thus, a giant Goos–Hänchen position shift is generated by this singular dark point at the totally internally reflected interface. This giant Goos–Hänchen shift has been applied not only for highly sensitive detection of biological molecules, but also for the observation of photonic spin Hall effect, which is important in quantum information processing and communications.
