= Hilda Hänchen =

German physicist (1919–2013)

- Born: 1 September 1919; Hamburg, Weimar Republic
- Died: 19 October 2013 (aged 94); Cologne, Germany
- Citizenship: German
- Education: University of Hamburg
- Known for: Goos-Hänchen effect
- Spouse: Albert Hermann Lindberg (m. 1946)
- Children: 3 daughters
- Scientific career
- Fields: Physics
- Workplaces: State Physics Institute in Hamburg, Physical-Chemical Research Institute in Kiel, Reichsforschungsrat ("Reich Research Council")
- Thesis: Über das Eindringen des totalreflektierten Lichtes in das dünnere Medium ("On the penetration of totally reflected light into the rarer medium") (1943)
- Doctoral advisor: Fritz Goos

Hilda Hänchen (later Hilda Lindberg or Hilda Lindberg-Hänchen, 1 September 1919 - 19 October 2013) was a German physicist.

== Life and work ==
Hilda Hänchen received her doctorate in 1943 from the University of Hamburg under the supervision of Fritz Goos, with a dissertation titled Über das Eindringen des totalreflektierten Lichtes in das dünnere Medium ("On the penetration of totally reflected light into the rarer medium"). During World War II she worked as a "managing" research assistant at the State Physics Institute in Hamburg (to allow male academics to return after military service, women could be employed as managing assistants only). She concurrently worked at the Physical-Chemical Research Institute in Kiel on war research contracts and was listed in the register of sponsorships of the Reichsforschungsrat ("Reich Research Council"). From 1949 to 1951 she was a referee for the chemistry journal Chemisches Zentralblatt. Around 1975 she was the chairperson of the local Cologne chapter of Deutscher Akademikerinnenbund ("Association of German women academics").

With her doctoral advisor Fritz Goos, Hänchen discovered the Goos–Hänchen effect, which is an optical phenomenon in which linearly polarized light undergoes a small lateral shift when totally internally reflected.

In 1946 she married physicist Albert Hermann Lindberg (born 1914), who before his retirement in 1979 served as the Vice President and Development Director of Leybold AG. They had three daughters - Renate, Claudia, and Dorothea.

== Publications ==
- Hänchen, Hilda (1943). "Über das Eindringen des totalreflektierten Lichtes in das dünnere Medium" [On the penetration of totally reflected light into the rarer medium]. Dissertation, University of Hamburg, Faculty of Mathematics and Natural Sciences (in German). 435 (5): 383. Bibcode:1943AnP...435..383G. doi:10.1002/andp.19434350504.
- Goos, Fritz; Hänchen, Hilda (1943). "Über das Eindringen des totalreflektierten Lichtes in das dünnere Medium" [On the penetration of totally reflected light into the rarer medium]. Annalen der Physik (in German). 435 (5): 383–392. Bibcode:1943AnP...435..383G. doi:10.1002/andp.19434350504.
- Goos, Fritz; Hänchen, Hilda (1947). "Ein neuer und fundamentaler Versuch zur Totalreflexion" [A new and fundamental experiment on total reflection] (PDF). Annalen der Physik (in German). 436 (6): 333–346. Bibcode:1947AnP...436..333G. doi:10.1002/andp.19474360704.
- Goos, Fritz; Hänchen, Hilda (1949). "Neumessung des Strahlversetzungseffektes bei Totalreflexion" [New measurement of the beam displacement effect in total internal reflection]. Annalen der Physik (in German). 440 (6): 251–252. Bibcode:1949AnP...440..251G. doi:10.1002/andp.19494400312.
