= Sylvia Skan =

English applied mathematician (1897–1972)

Sylvia Winifred Skan (15 August 1897 – 10 June 1972) was an English applied mathematician. She is known for her work on aerodynamics, and in particular for the Falkner–Skan boundary layer in the fluid mechanics of airflow past a wedge-shaped obstacle, which she wrote about with V. M. Falkner in 1930, and for the associated Falkner–Skan equation.

Skan was born in Bickenhill on 15 August 1897, the oldest of five children of botanist Sidney Alfred Skan and of his wife Jane Alkins. She does not appear to have earned a university degree. By 1923 she was working for the Aerodynamics Department of the National Physical Laboratory, where she carried out the entirety of her career.

As well as co-authored research papers, 17 of which listed her as first author, her works included translations of research papers from French, German and Russian into English, and a two-volume single-authored book, Handbook for Computers (1954), describing the mathematics needed for human computers.
