= Raymond Thayer Birge =

American physical chemist (1887–1980)

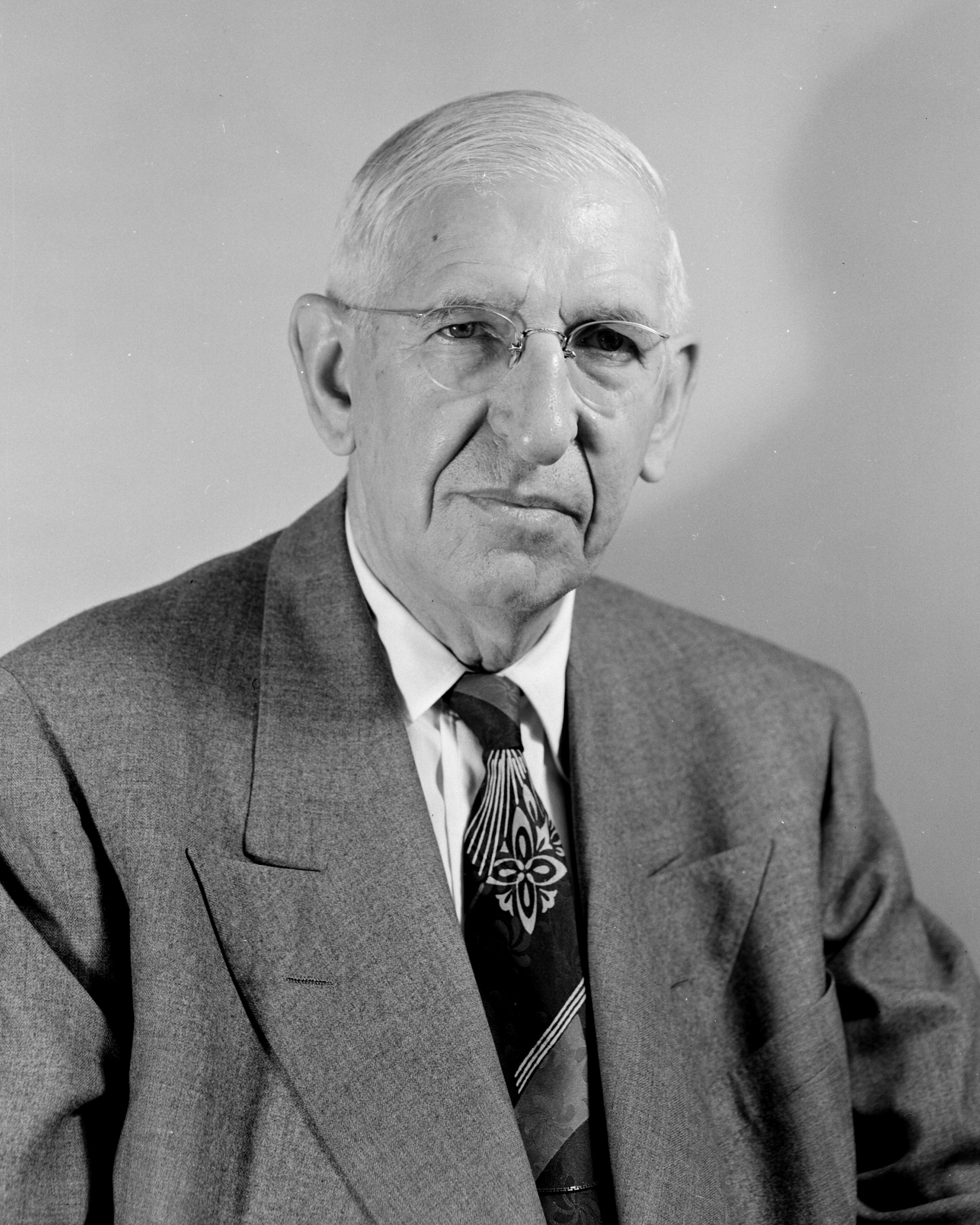
- Birge in 1954
- Born: March 13, 1887; Brooklyn, New York, U.S.
- Died: March 22, 1980 (aged 93); Berkeley, California, U.S.
- Education: University of Wisconsin
- Scientific career
- Fields: Physics
- Institutions: Syracuse University; University of California, Berkeley

Raymond Thayer Birge (March 13, 1887 – March 22, 1980) was an American physicist.

== Career ==
Born in Brooklyn, New York, into a family of academic scientists, Birge obtained his doctorate from the University of Wisconsin in 1913. In the same year he married Irene A. Walsh. The Birges had two children, Carolyn Elizabeth (Mrs. E. D. Yocky) and Robert Walsh, Associate Director of the Lawrence Berkeley National Laboratory in 1973-1981. After five years as an instructor at Syracuse University, he became a member of the physics department at University of California, Berkeley, where he remained until he retired, as chairman, in 1955.

On his arrival at Berkeley, Birge sought collaboration with the Berkeley College of Chemistry, then under the leadership of Gilbert N. Lewis. However, Birge's championing of the Bohr atom led him into conflict with the chemists who defended Lewis' earlier theory of the cubical atom. Birge was unafraid of scientific controversy and persevered with his course on atomic structure, attracting future Nobel Laureates in chemistry William Francis Giauque and Harold Clayton Urey. His work on molecular spectra included the development of the Birge-Sponer method, which was later generalized by the LeRoy-Bernstein theory.

Birge's later work arose from his initial bewilderment at the variety and inconsistency among measurements of the fundamental physical constants. His interest led to a broad mastery of all branches of the physical sciences and gave fruit with many publications, in particular, a 1929 paper in Reviews of Modern Physics that recommended a standard set of values for the constants based on earlier published results. There ensued a frustration with the conventional methods of statistics as applied in physical science which led to a collaboration with W. Edwards Deming. Following their 1934 joint paper in Reviews of Modern Physics, their approaches diverged with Deming following the work of Walter A. Shewhart while Birge became interested in the more conventional statistical approaches of least squares and maximum likelihood. Birge's interest in statistics led him to the investigation of parapsychology in which he conducted many experiments without finding any conclusive results.

== Leadership of Berkeley Physics Department ==
Birge was an active administrator and was the architect of the department's prestige, seeking out physicists such as Robert Oppenheimer and Ernest Lawrence and guiding the department through its golden years of the 1930s and through the changes brought on by World War II, the Manhattan Project, and the birth of "Big Science."

In the late 1930s, Birge opposed the creation of an assistant professorship for Oppenheimer's associate Robert Serber, writing another colleague that "one Jew in the department is enough." Both Oppenheimer and Serber were Jewish.

During the McCarthy era in 1949, the Regents of the University of California enforced an anti-communist oath to be signed by all employees. Though an outspoken critic of the oath, after much searching of conscience, Birge decided that his loyalty to the department and the university demanded that he sign and fight from within for freedom of speech. Many of his colleagues did not sign and were dismissed.

== Death and honors ==
Birge died in Berkeley, California. His honors include:

- President of the American Physical Society;
- Member of the National Academy of Sciences;
- Member of the American Philosophical Society; and
- Honorary degree of LLD from the University of California, Berkeley.

In December 1964, the new physics building on Berkeley campus, Birge Hall, was dedicated to Raymond Birge.
