= Birge–Sponer method =

In molecular spectroscopy, the Birge–Sponer method or Birge–Sponer plot is a way to calculate the dissociation energy of a molecule. This method takes its name from Raymond Thayer Birge and Hertha Sponer, the two physical chemists that developed it. A detailed example may be found here.

== Description ==
By observing transitions between as many vibrational energy levels as possible, for example through electronic or infrared spectroscopy, the difference between the energy levels, $\Delta G_{v+\frac{1}{2}}=G(v+1)-G(v)$ can be calculated. This sum will have a maximum at $v_{\rm max}$, representing the point of bond dissociation; summing over all the differences up to this point gives the total energy required to dissociate the molecule, i.e. to promote it from the ground state to an unbound state. This can be written:

$$D_0=\sum_{v=0}^{v_{\rm max}} \Delta G_{v+\frac{1}{2}}$$

where $D_0$ is the dissociation energy. If a Morse potential is assumed, plotting $\Delta G_{v+\frac{1}{2}}$ against $v+1/2$ should give a straight line, from which it is easy to extract $v_{\rm max}$ from the intercept with the x-axis. In practice, such plots often give curves because of unaccounted anharmonicity in the potential; furthermore, the low population of the higher states (or the Franck–Condon principle) makes it difficult to experimentally obtain data at high values of $v$. Thus the extrapolation can be inaccurate and only an upper limit for the value of the dissociation energy can be obtained.
