= Sidney Alfred Skan =

- Born: 13 August 1870; Kinton Green, Warwickshire, England
- Died: 19 December 1939; Kew, London, Surrey, England
- Citizenship: United Kingdom
- Known for: Botanical librarian and taxonomist; contributions to Flora of Tropical Africa and Index florae sinensis
- Scientific career
- Fields: Botany
- Institutions: Royal Botanic Gardens, Kew

Sidney Alfred Skan (13 August 1870 – 19 December 1939) was a British gardener, botanist, and librarian associated with the Royal Botanic Gardens, Kew.

== Biography ==
Sidney Alfred Skan was born on 13 August (according to other sources, 30 August) 1870 in Kinton Green, Warwickshire, England. He studied horticulture at the Birmingham Botanical Gardens in Edgbaston under William Bradbury Latham.

In 1892, he joined the Royal Botanic Gardens, Kew, working initially in the arboretum. From 1894, Skan was employed in the Kew Herbarium Library as assistant to William Botting Hemsley. By 1899, he had effectively taken charge of the library, issuing annual catalogues of new accessions until 1916.

Although library work occupied much of his time, Skan also carried out botanical studies. For the book Index florae sinensis he prepared treatments of the families Juglandaceae, Fagaceae (as Cupuliferae), Ceratophyllaceae, and Gnetaceae. Together with Hemsley, he authored the section on the family Scrophulariaceae in Flora of Tropical Africa (1906). From 1897 to 1915 he issued annual lists of plants newly introduced into cultivation at Kew.

Skan retired from his position at the Kew library in 1933. He died on 19 December 1939 in Kew, London, Surrey.

=== Personal life ===
He was the father of five children, among others mathematician Sylvia Skan.

== Selected publications ==
- Skan, S.A. (1910). “Labiatae”. In: W.H. Harvey et al. (eds.), Flora capensis, Vol. 5, Sect. 1(2): 226–387.

== Taxa named in his honour ==
- Quercus skaniana Dunn, 1908 [≡ Lithocarpus skanianus (Dunn) Rehder, 1919]
