= Laplacian of the indicator =

Limit of sequence of smooth functions

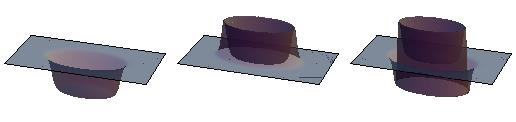
An approximation of the negative indicator function of an ellipse in the plane (left), the derivative in the direction normal to the boundary (middle), and its Laplacian (right). In the limit, the right-most graph goes to the (negative) Laplacian of the indicator. Purely intuitively speaking, the right-most graph resembles an elliptic castle with a castle wall on the inside and a moat in front of it; in the limit, the wall and moat become infinitely high and deep (and narrow).

In potential theory (a branch of mathematics), the Laplacian of the indicator is obtained by letting the Laplace operator work on the indicator function of some domain D. It is a generalisation of the derivative (or "prime function") of the Dirac delta function to higher dimensions; it is non-zero only on the surface of D. It can be viewed as a surface delta prime function, the derivative of a surface delta function (a generalization of the Dirac delta). The Laplacian of the indicator is also analogous to the second derivative of the Heaviside step function in one dimension.

The Laplacian of the indicator can be thought of as having infinitely positive and negative values when evaluated very near the boundary of the domain D. Therefore, it is not strictly a function but a generalized function or measure. Similarly to the derivative of the Dirac delta function in one dimension, the Laplacian of the indicator only makes sense as a mathematical object when it appears under an integral sign; i.e. it is a distribution function. Just as in the formulation of distribution theory, it is in practice regarded as a limit of a sequence of smooth functions; one may meaningfully take the Laplacian of a bump function, which is smooth by definition, and let the bump function approach the indicator in the limit.

== History ==
Paul Dirac introduced the Dirac δ-function, as it has become known, as early as 1930. The one-dimensional Dirac δ-function is non-zero only at a single point. Likewise, the multidimensional generalisation, as it is usually made, is non-zero only at a single point. In Cartesian coordinates, the d-dimensional Dirac δ-function is a product of d one-dimensional δ-functions; one for each Cartesian coordinate (see e.g. generalizations of the Dirac delta function).

== Surface delta function ==
A generalisation of the Dirac delta is possible beyond a single point. The point zero, in one dimension, can be considered as the boundary of the positive halfline. The function 1_{x>0} equals 1 on the positive halfline and zero otherwise, and is also known as the Heaviside step function. Formally, the Dirac δ-function and its derivative can be viewed as the first and second derivative of the Heaviside step function, i.e. ∂_{x}1_{x>0} and $\partial_x^2 \mathbf{1}_{x>0}$.

The analogue of the step function in higher dimensions is the indicator function, which can be written as 1_{x∈D}, where D is some domain. The indicator function is also known as the characteristic function. In analogy with the one-dimensional case, the following higher-dimensional generalisations of the Dirac δ-function and its derivative have been proposed:

$$\begin{align}
\delta(x) &\to -n_x\cdot\nabla_x\mathbf{1}_{x\in D},
\\
\delta'(x) &\to \nabla_x^2 \mathbf{1}_{x\in D}.
\end{align}$$

Here n is the outward normal vector. Here the Dirac δ-function is generalised to a surface delta function on the boundary of some domain D in d ≥ 1 dimensions. This definition gives the usual one-dimensional case, when the domain is taken to be the positive halfline. It is zero except on the boundary of the domain D (where it is infinite), and it integrates to the total surface area enclosing D, as shown below.

== Surface delta prime function ==
The one-dimensional Dirac delta prime function is generalised to a multidimensional surface delta prime function on the boundary of some domain D in d ≥ 1 dimensions. In one dimension and by taking D equal to the positive halfline, the usual one-dimensional δ'-function can be recovered.

Both the normal derivative of the indicator and the Laplacian of the indicator are supported by surfaces rather than points. The generalisation is useful in e.g. quantum mechanics, as surface interactions can lead to boundary conditions in d > 1, while point interactions cannot. Naturally, point and surface interactions coincide for d=1. Both surface and point interactions have a long history in quantum mechanics, and there exists a sizeable literature on so-called surface delta potentials or delta-sphere interactions. Surface delta functions use the one-dimensional Dirac δ-function, but as a function of the radial coordinate r, e.g. δ(r−R) where R is the radius of the sphere.

Although seemingly ill-defined, derivatives of the indicator function can formally be defined using the theory of distributions or generalized functions: one can obtain a well-defined prescription by postulating that the Laplacian of the indicator, for example, is defined by two integrations by parts when it appears under an integral sign. Alternatively, the indicator (and its derivatives) can be approximated using a bump function (and its derivatives). The limit, where the (smooth) bump function approaches the indicator function, must then be put outside of the integral.

== Proofs ==
=== Proof of the surface delta prime function ===
This section will prove that the Laplacian of the indicator is a surface delta prime function. The surface delta function will be considered below.

First, for a function f in the interval (a,b), recall the fundamental theorem of calculus

$$\int_a^b \frac{\partial f(x)}{\partial x}\,dx=\underset{x \nearrow b}\lim f(x)-\underset{x \searrow a}\lim f(x),$$

assuming that f is locally integrable. Now for a < b it follows, by proceeding heuristically, that

$$\begin{align}
\int_{-\infty}^{+\infty}  \frac{\partial^2\mathbf{1}_{a<x<b}}{\partial x^2}\,f(x)\;dx&=\int_{-\infty}^{+\infty}  \mathbf{1}_{a<x<b} \frac{\partial^2 f(x)}{\partial x^2}\;dx,
\\
&=\displaystyle\int_a^b \frac{\partial^2 f(x)}{\partial x^2}\;dx,
\\
&=\displaystyle\Big(\underset{ x \nearrow b}\lim -\underset{ x \searrow a}\lim\Big) \frac{\partial f(x)}{\partial x}.
\end{align}$$

Here 1_{a<x<b} is the indicator function of the domain a < x < b. The indicator equals one when the condition in its subscript is satisfied, and zero otherwise. In this calculation, two integrations by parts (combined with the fundamental theorem of calculus as shown above) show that the first equality holds; the boundary terms are zero when a and b are finite, or when f vanishes at infinity. The last equality shows a sum of outward normal derivatives, where the sum is over the boundary points a and b, and where the signs follow from the outward direction (i.e. positive for b and negative for a). Although derivatives of the indicator do not formally exist, following the usual rules of partial integration provides the 'correct' result. When considering a finite d-dimensional domain D, the sum over outward normal derivatives is expected to become an integral, which can be confirmed as follows:

$$\begin{align}
\int _{\mathbf{R}^d}\nabla_x^2\mathbf{1}_{x\in D}\,f(x)\;dx&= \int _{\mathbf{R}^d}\mathbf{1}_{x\in D}\,\nabla_x^2 f(x)\;dx,\\
&= \int _{D}\,\nabla_x^2 f(x)\;dx,\\
&= \oint_{\partial D}\,\underset{x \to \beta}\lim n_\beta \cdot \nabla_x f(x)\;d\beta.
\end{align}$$

where the limit is of x approaching surface β from inside domain D, n_{β} is the unit vector normal to surface β, and ∇_{x} is now the multidimensional gradient operator. As before, the first equality follows by two integrations by parts (in higher dimensions this proceeds by Green's second identity) where the boundary terms disappear as long as the domain D is finite or if f vanishes at infinity; e.g. both 1_{x∈D} and ∇_{x}1_{x∈D} are zero when evaluated at the 'boundary' of R^{d} when the domain D is finite. The third equality follows by the divergence theorem and shows, again, a sum (or, in this case, an integral) of outward normal derivatives over all boundary locations. The divergence theorem is valid for piecewise smooth domains D, and hence D needs to be piecewise smooth.

Thus the surface delta prime function (a.k.a. Dirac δ'-function) exists on a piecewise smooth surface, and is equivalent to the Laplacian of the indicator function of the domain D encompassed by that piecewise smooth surface. Naturally, the difference between a point and a surface disappears in one dimension.

In electrostatics, a surface dipole (or Double layer potential) can be modelled by the limiting distribution of the Laplacian of the indicator.

The calculation above derives from research on path integrals in quantum physics.

=== Proof of the surface delta function ===
This section will prove that the (inward) normal derivative of the indicator is a surface delta function.

For a finite domain D or when f vanishes at infinity, it follows by the divergence theorem that

$$\int _{\mathbf{R}^d}\nabla_x^2\left (\mathbf{1}_{x\in D}\,f(x)\right )\;dx= 0.$$

By the product rule, it follows that

$$\int _{\mathbf{R}^d}\,\nabla_x^2\mathbf{1}_{x\in D}\,f(x)\;dx+ \int_{\mathbf{R}^d}\mathbf{1}_{x\in D}\,\nabla_x^2 f(x)\;dx =-2 \int _{\mathbf{R}^d} \nabla_x \mathbf{1}_{x\in D}\cdot \nabla_x f(x)\;dx.$$

Following from the analysis of the section above, the two terms on the left-hand side are equal, and thus

$$\oint_{\partial D}\,\underset{\alpha \to \beta}\lim n_\beta \cdot \nabla_\alpha f(\alpha)\;d\beta =-\displaystyle \int _{\mathbf{R}^d}\nabla_x\mathbf{1}_{x\in D}\cdot \nabla_x f(x)\;dx.$$

The gradient of the indicator vanishes everywhere, except near the boundary of D, where it points in the normal direction. Therefore, only the component of ∇_{x}f(x) in the normal direction is relevant. Suppose that, near the boundary, ∇_{x}f(x) is equal to n_{x}g(x), where g is some other function. Then it follows that

$$\oint _{\partial D}\,g(\beta)\;d\beta=-\int_{\mathbf{R}^d}\,\nabla_x\mathbf{1}_{x\in D}\,\cdot\,n_x\,g(x)\;dx.$$

The outward normal n_{x} was originally only defined for x in the surface, but it can be defined to exist for all x; for example by taking the outward normal of the boundary point nearest to x.

The foregoing analysis shows that −n_{x} ⋅ ∇_{x}1_{x∈D} can be regarded as the surface generalisation of the one-dimensional Dirac delta function. By setting the function g equal to one, it follows that the inward normal derivative of the indicator integrates to the surface area of D.

In electrostatics, surface charge densities (or single boundary layers) can be modelled using the surface delta function as above. The usual Dirac delta function be used in some cases, e.g. when the surface is spherical. In general, the surface delta function discussed here may be used to represent the surface charge density on a surface of any shape.

The calculation above derives from research on path integrals in quantum physics.

== Approximations by bump functions ==
This section shows how derivatives of the indicator can be treated numerically under an integral sign.

In principle, the indicator cannot be differentiated numerically, since its derivative is either zero or infinite. But, for practical purposes, the indicator can be approximated by a bump function, indicated by I_{ε}(x) and approaching the indicator for ε → 0. Several options are possible, but it is convenient to let the bump function be non-negative and approach the indicator from below, i.e.

$$\begin{align}
0 \leq I_\varepsilon(x)& \leq \mathbf{1}_{{x}\in D}\quad \forall \varepsilon >0\\
\underset{\varepsilon \searrow 0}\lim\; I_\varepsilon(x)&=\mathbf{1}_{x\in D}
\end{align}$$

This ensures that the family of bump functions is identically zero outside of D. This is convenient, since it is possible that the function f is only defined in the interior of D. For f defined in D, we thus obtain the following:

$$\begin{align}
- \underset{\varepsilon \searrow 0}\lim \int _{\mathbf{R}^d}\,f(x)\, n_x \cdot \nabla_x I_{\varepsilon}(x)\;dx &= \oint _{\partial D}\,\underset{\alpha \to \beta}\lim f(\alpha)\;d\beta, \\
\underset{\varepsilon \searrow 0}\lim\,\int _{\mathbf{R}^d}\nabla_x^2 I_{\varepsilon}(x)\,f(x)\;dx&= \oint_{\partial D}\,\underset{\alpha \to \beta}\lim n_\beta \cdot \nabla_\alpha f(\alpha)\;d\beta,
\end{align}$$

where the interior coordinate α approaches the boundary coordinate β from the interior of D, and where there is no requirement for f to exist outside of D.

When f is defined on both sides of the boundary, and is furthermore differentiable across the boundary of D, then it is less crucial how the bump function approaches the indicator.

== Discontinuous test functions ==
If the test function f is possibly discontinuous across the boundary, then distribution theory for discontinuous functions may be used to make sense of surface distributions, see e.g. section V in . In practice, for the surface delta function this usually means averaging the value of f on both sides of the boundary of D before integrating over the boundary. Likewise, for the surface delta prime function it usually means averaging the outward normal derivative of f on both sides of the boundary of the domain D before integrating over the boundary.

== Applications ==
=== Quantum mechanics ===
In quantum mechanics, point interactions are well known and there is a large body of literature on the subject. A well-known example of a one-dimensional singular potential is the Schrödinger equation with a Dirac delta potential. The one-dimensional Dirac delta prime potential, on the other hand, has caused controversy. The controversy was seemingly settled by an independent paper, although even this paper attracted later criticism.

A lot more attention has been focused on the one-dimensional Dirac delta prime potential recently.

A point on the one-dimensional line can be considered both as a point and as surface; as a point marks the boundary between two regions. Two generalisations of the Dirac delta-function to higher dimensions have thus been made: the generalisation to a multidimensional point, as well as the generalisation to a multidimensional surface.

The former generalisations are known as point interactions, whereas the latter are known under different names, e.g. "delta-sphere interactions" and "surface delta interactions". The latter generalisations may use derivatives of the indicator, as explained here, or the one-dimensional Dirac δ-function as a function of the radial coordinate r.

=== Fluid dynamics ===
The Laplacian of the indicator has been used in fluid dynamics, e.g. to model the interfaces between different media.

=== Molecular dynamics ===
In molecular dynamics, the divergence of the indicator can be shown to occur in the context of applying the control volume to the molecular Cauchy stress tensor, which provides a bridge between continuum mechanics and molecular dynamics

=== Surface reconstruction ===
The divergence of the indicator and the Laplacian of the indicator (or of the characteristic function, as the indicator is also known) have been used as the sample information from which surfaces can be reconstructed.

== See also ==
- Delta potential – Model of an energy potential in quantum mechanics
- Dirac delta function – Generalized function whose value is zero everywhere except at zero
- Distribution (mathematics)
- Double layer potential
- Electrostatics – Study of still or slow electric charges
- Generalized function – Objects extending the notion of functions
- Indicator function – Mathematical function characterizing set membership
- Potential theory – Harmonic functions as solutions to Laplace's equation
