= Double layer potential =

In potential theory, an area of mathematics, a double layer potential is a solution of Laplace's equation corresponding to the electrostatic or magnetic potential associated to a dipole distribution on a closed surface S in three-dimensions. Thus a double layer potential u(x) is a scalar-valued function of x ∈ R^{3} given by
$$u(\mathbf{x}) = \frac {-1} {4\pi} \int_S \rho(\mathbf{y}) \frac{\partial}{\partial\nu} \frac{1}{|\mathbf{x}-\mathbf{y}|} \, d\sigma(\mathbf{y})$$
where ρ denotes the dipole distribution, ∂/∂ν denotes the directional derivative in the direction of the outward unit normal in the y variable, and dσ is the surface measure on S.

More generally, a double layer potential is associated to a hypersurface S in n-dimensional Euclidean space by means of
$$u(\mathbf{x}) = \int_S \rho(\mathbf{y})\frac{\partial}{\partial\nu} P(\mathbf{x}-\mathbf{y})\,d\sigma(\mathbf{y})$$
where P(y) is the Newtonian kernel in n dimensions.

== See also ==
- Single layer potential
- Potential theory
- Electrostatics
- Laplacian of the indicator
