= Delta potential =

Model of an energy potential in quantum mechanics

In quantum mechanics the delta potential is a potential well mathematically described by the Dirac delta function - a generalized function. Qualitatively, it corresponds to a potential which is zero everywhere, except at a single point, where it takes an infinite value. This can be used to simulate situations where a particle is free to move in two regions of space with a barrier between the two regions. For example, an electron can move almost freely in a conducting material, but if two conducting surfaces are put close together, the interface between them acts as a barrier for the electron that can be approximated by a delta potential.

The delta potential well is a limiting case of the finite potential well, which is obtained if one maintains the product of the width of the well and the potential constant while decreasing the well's width and increasing the potential.

This article, for simplicity, only considers a one-dimensional potential well, but analysis could be expanded to more dimensions.

== Single delta potential ==
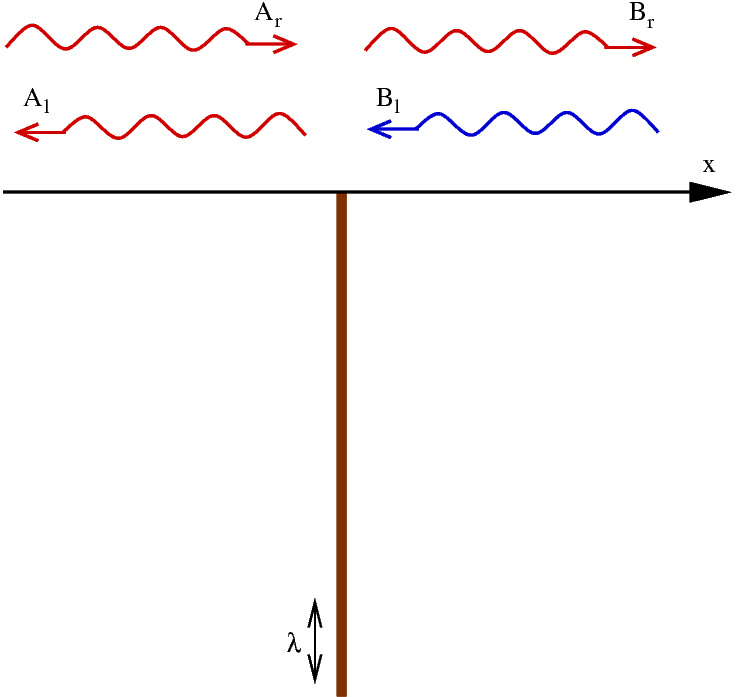

The time-independent Schrödinger equation for the wave function ψ(x) of a particle in one dimension in a potential V(x) is $-\frac{\hbar^2}{2m} \frac{d^2 \psi(x)}{dx^2} + V(x) \psi(x) = E \psi(x),$ where ħ is the reduced Planck constant, and E is the energy of the particle.

The delta potential is the potential $V(x) = \lambda \delta(x),$ where δ(x) is the Dirac delta function.

It is called a delta potential well if λ is negative, and a delta potential barrier if λ is positive. The delta has been defined to occur at the origin for simplicity; a shift in the delta function's argument does not change any of the following results.

=== Solving the Schrödinger equation ===
The potential splits the space in two parts (x < 0 and x > 0). In each of these parts the potential is zero, and the Schrödinger equation reduces to $\frac{d^2\psi}{dx^2} = -\frac{2mE}{\hbar^2} \psi;$ this is a linear differential equation with constant coefficients, whose solutions are linear combinations of e^{ikx} and e^{−ikx}, where the wave number k is related to the energy by $k = \frac{\sqrt{2mE}}{\hbar}.$

In general, due to the presence of the delta potential in the origin, the coefficients of the solution need not be the same in both half-spaces:
$$\psi(x) = \begin{cases}
\psi_\text{L}(x) = A_\text{r} e^{ikx} + A_\text{l} e^{-ikx}, & \text{ if } x < 0, \\
\psi_\text{R}(x) = B_\text{r} e^{ikx} + B_\text{l} e^{-ikx}, & \text{ if } x > 0,
\end{cases}$$
where, in the case of positive energies (real k), e^{ikx} represents a wave traveling to the right, and e^{−ikx} one traveling to the left.

One obtains a relation between the coefficients by imposing that the wavefunction be continuous at the origin: $\psi(0) = \psi_L(0) = \psi_R(0) = A_r + A_l = B_r + B_l,$

A second relation can be found by studying the derivative of the wavefunction. Normally, we could also impose differentiability at the origin, but this is not possible because of the delta potential. However, if we integrate the Schrödinger equation around x = 0, over an interval $[-\varepsilon,\varepsilon]$: $-\frac{\hbar^2}{2m} \int_{-\varepsilon}^{+\varepsilon} \psi''(x) \,dx + \int_{-\varepsilon}^{+\varepsilon} V(x)\psi(x) \,dx = E \int_{-\varepsilon}^{+\varepsilon} \psi(x) \,dx.$

In the limit as $\varepsilon \to 0$, the right-hand side of this equation vanishes; the left-hand side becomes $-\frac{\hbar^2}{2m} [\psi_R'(0) - \psi_L'(0)] + \lambda \psi(0),$ because $\int_{-\varepsilon}^{+\varepsilon} \psi''(x) \,dx = [\psi'(+\varepsilon) - \psi'(-\varepsilon)].$ Substituting the definition of ψ into this expression yields $-\frac{\hbar^2}{2m} ik (-A_r + A_l + B_r - B_l) + \lambda(A_r + A_l) = 0.$

The boundary conditions thus give the following restrictions on the coefficients
$$\begin{cases}
A_r + A_l - B_r - B_l &= 0,\\
-A_r + A_l + B_r - B_l &= \frac{2m\lambda}{ik\hbar^2} (A_r + A_l).
\end{cases}$$

=== Bound state (E < 0) ===
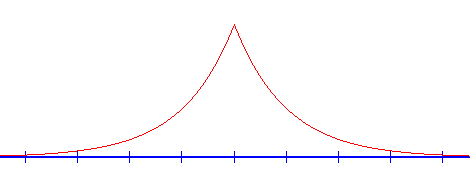
The graph of the bound state wavefunction solution to the delta function potential is continuous everywhere, but its derivative is not defined at x = 0.

In any one-dimensional attractive potential there will be a bound state. To find its energy, note that for E < 0, k = i√2m|E|/ħ = iκ is imaginary, and the wave functions which were oscillating for positive energies in the calculation above are now exponentially increasing or decreasing functions of x (see above). Requiring that the wave functions do not diverge at infinity eliminates half of the terms: A_{r} = B_{l} = 0. The wave function is then
$$\psi(x) = \begin{cases}
\psi_\text{L}(x) = A_\text{l} e^{\kappa x}, & \text{ if } x \le 0, \\
\psi_\text{R}(x) = B_\text{r} e^{-\kappa x}, & \text{ if } x \ge 0.
\end{cases}$$

From the boundary conditions and normalization conditions, it follows that
$$\begin{cases}
A_\text{l} = B_\text{r} = \sqrt{\kappa},\\
\kappa = -\frac{m \lambda}{\hbar^2},
\end{cases}$$
from which it follows that λ must be negative, that is, the bound state only exists for the well, and not for the barrier. The Fourier transform of this wave function is a Lorentzian function.

The energy of the bound state is then $E = -\frac{\hbar^2\kappa^2}{2m} = -\frac{m\lambda^2}{2\hbar^2}.$

=== Scattering (E > 0) ===
Transmission (T) and reflection (R) probability of a delta potential well. The energy E > 0 is in units of $\frac{m\lambda^2}{2\hbar^2}$. Dashed: classical result. Solid line: quantum mechanics.

For positive energies, the particle is free to move in either half-space: x < 0 or x > 0. It may be scattered at the delta-function potential.

The quantum case can be studied in the following situation: a particle incident on the barrier from the left side (A_{r}). It may be reflected (A_{l}) or transmitted (B_{r}). To find the amplitudes for reflection and transmission for incidence from the left, we put in the above equations A_{r} = 1 (incoming particle), A_{l} = r (reflection), B_{l} = 0 (no incoming particle from the right) and B_{r} = t (transmission), and solve for r and t even though we do not have any equations in t. The result is $t = \cfrac{1}{1 - \cfrac{m\lambda}{i\hbar^2k}}, \quad r = \cfrac{1}{\cfrac{i\hbar^2 k}{m\lambda} - 1}.$

Due to the mirror symmetry of the model, the amplitudes for incidence from the right are the same as those from the left. The result is that there is a non-zero probability $R = |r|^2 = \cfrac{1}{1 + \cfrac{\hbar^4 k^2}{m^2\lambda^2}} = \cfrac{1}{1 + \cfrac{2\hbar^2 E}{m \lambda^2}}$ for the particle to be reflected. This does not depend on the sign of λ, that is, a barrier has the same probability of reflecting the particle as a well. This is a significant difference from classical mechanics, where the reflection probability would be 1 for the barrier (the particle simply bounces back), and 0 for the well (the particle passes through the well undisturbed).

The probability for transmission is $T = |t|^2 = 1 - R = \cfrac{1}{1 + \cfrac{m^2\lambda^2}{\hbar^4 k^2}} = \cfrac{1}{1 + \cfrac{m \lambda^2}{2\hbar^2 E}}.$

=== Remarks and application ===
The calculation presented above may at first seem unrealistic and hardly useful. However, it has proved to be a suitable model for a variety of real-life systems.

One such example regards the interfaces between two conducting materials. In the bulk of the materials, the motion of the electrons is quasi-free and can be described by the kinetic term in the above Hamiltonian with an effective mass m. Often, the surfaces of such materials are covered with oxide layers or are not ideal for other reasons. This thin, non-conducting layer may then be modeled by a local delta-function potential as above. Electrons may then tunnel from one material to the other giving rise to a current.

The operation of a scanning tunneling microscope (STM) relies on this tunneling effect. In that case, the barrier is due to the air between the tip of the STM and the underlying object. The strength of the barrier is related to the separation being stronger the further apart the two are. For a more general model of this situation, see Finite potential barrier (QM). The delta function potential barrier is the limiting case of the model considered there for very high and narrow barriers.

The above model is one-dimensional while the space around us is three-dimensional. So, in fact, one should solve the Schrödinger equation in three dimensions. On the other hand, many systems only change along one coordinate direction and are translationally invariant along the others. The Schrödinger equation may then be reduced to the case considered here by an Ansatz for the wave function of the type $\Psi(x,y,z)=\psi(x)\phi(y,z)\,\!$.

Alternatively, it is possible to generalize the delta function to exist on the surface of some domain D (see Laplacian of the indicator).

The delta function model is actually a one-dimensional version of the Hydrogen atom according to the dimensional scaling method developed by the group of Dudley R. Herschbach The delta function model becomes particularly useful with the double-well Dirac Delta function model which represents a one-dimensional version of the Hydrogen molecule ion, as shown in the following section.

== Double delta potential ==
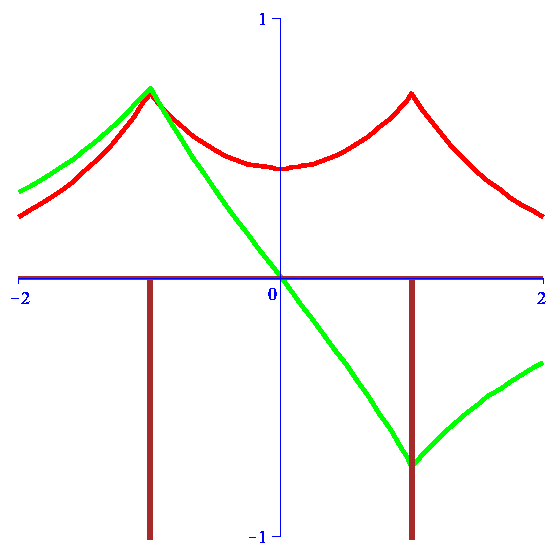
The symmetric and anti-symmetric wavefunctions for the double-well Dirac delta function model with "internuclear" distance R = 2

The double-well Dirac delta function models a diatomic hydrogen molecule by the corresponding Schrödinger equation: $-\frac{\hbar^2}{2m} \frac{d^2 \psi(x)}{dx^2} + V(x) \psi(x) = E \psi(x),$ where the potential is now $V(x) = -q \left[ \delta \left(x + \frac{R}{2}\right) + \lambda\delta \left(x - \frac{R}{2} \right) \right],$ where $0 < R < \infty$ is the "internuclear" distance with Dirac delta-function (negative) peaks located at x = ±R/2 (shown in brown in the diagram). Keeping in mind the relationship of this model with its three-dimensional molecular counterpart, we use atomic units and set $\hbar = m = 1$. Here $0 < \lambda < 1$ is a formally adjustable parameter. From the single-well case, we can infer the "ansatz" for the solution to be $\psi(x) = A e^{-d \left|x + \frac{R}{2}\right|} + B e^{-d \left|x - \frac{R}{2} \right|}.$ Matching of the wavefunction at the Dirac delta-function peaks yields the determinant
$$\begin{vmatrix}
q - d & q e^{-d R} \\
q \lambda e^{-d R} & q \lambda - d
\end{vmatrix} = 0,
\quad \text{where } E = -\frac{d^2}{2}.$$
Thus, $d$ is found to be governed by the pseudo-quadratic equation $d_\pm(\lambda ) = \frac{1}{2} q(\lambda + 1) \pm \frac{1}{2} \left\{q^2(1 + \lambda)^2 - 4\lambda q^2 \left[1 - e^{-2d_\pm(\lambda )R}\right]\right\}^{1/2},$ which has two solutions $d = d_{\pm}$. For the case of equal charges (symmetric homonuclear case), λ = 1, and the pseudo-quadratic reduces to $d_\pm = q \left[1 \pm e^{-d_\pm R}\right].$ The "+" case corresponds to a wave function symmetric about the midpoint (shown in red in the diagram), where A = B, and is called gerade. Correspondingly, the "−" case is the wave function that is anti-symmetric about the midpoint, where A = −B, and is called ungerade (shown in green in the diagram). They represent an approximation of the two lowest discrete energy states of the three-dimensional $\ce{H2^+}$ and are useful in its analysis. Analytical solutions for the energy eigenvalues for the case of symmetric charges are given by $d_\pm = q + W(\pm q R e^{-q R}) / R,$ where W is the standard Lambert W function. Note that the lowest energy corresponds to the symmetric solution $d_+$. In the case of unequal charges, and for that matter the three-dimensional molecular problem, the solutions are given by a generalization of the Lambert W function (see Lambert W function § Generalizations).

One of the most interesting cases is when qR ≤ 1, which results in $d_- = 0$. Thus, one has a non-trivial bound state solution with E = 0. For these specific parameters, there are many interesting properties that occur, one of which is the unusual effect that the transmission coefficient is unity at zero energy.

== See also ==
- Free particle
- Particle in a box
- Finite potential well
- Particle in a ring
- Particle in a spherically symmetric potential
- Quantum harmonic oscillator
- Hydrogen atom or hydrogen-like atom
- Ring wave guide
- Particle in a one-dimensional lattice (periodic potential)
- Hydrogen molecular ion
- Holstein–Herring method
- Laplacian of the indicator
- List of quantum-mechanical systems with analytical solutions

== Bibliography ==
- Griffiths, David J. (2005). Introduction to Quantum Mechanics (2nd ed.). Prentice Hall. pp. 68–78. ISBN 978-0-13-111892-8.
- For the 3-dimensional case look for the "delta shell potential"; further see K. Gottfried (1966), Quantum Mechanics Volume I: Fundamentals, ch. III, sec. 15.
