= Quantum dot laser =

Semiconductor laser that uses quantum dots as the active laser medium

A quantum dot laser is a semiconductor laser that uses quantum dots as the active medium for stimulated emission of light. Due to quantum confinement of charge carriers in all three spatial directions, their energy spectrum in quantum dots is discrete and resembles that in atoms. Injection lasers based on semiconductor quantum dot heterostructures promise device characteristics superior to traditional semiconductor lasers based on quantum wells and even more so bulk active medium. Improvements in lasing threshold, relative intensity noise, linewidth enhancement factor and temperature-insensitivity have already been demonstrated in quantum dot lasers. The quantum dot active region may also be engineered to operate at different wavelengths by varying dot sizes and composition. This allows to fabricate quantum dot lasers operating at wavelengths beyond those achievable in quantum well lasers.

In injection lasers based on self-assembled quantum dots obtained by Stranski-Krastanov growth mode, inhomogeneous line broadening is inherently present that is caused by quantum dot size-dispersion. Inhomogeneous line broadening adversely affects the quantum dot laser characteristics; in particular, it makes the threshold current higher and more temperature-sensitive. Hence a strict control of uniformity of quantum dots is required in self-organized laser structures.

Devices based on quantum dot active media have found commercial application in medicine (laser scalpel, optical coherence tomography), display technologies (projection, laser TV), spectroscopy and telecommunications. A 10 Gbit/s quantum dot laser that is insensitive to temperature fluctuation for use in optical data communications and optical networks has been developed using this technology. The laser is capable of high-speed operation at 1.3 μm wavelengths, at temperatures from 20 °C to 70 °C. It works in optical data transmission systems, optical LANs and metro-access systems. In comparison to the performance of conventional strained quantum-well lasers of the past, the new quantum dot laser achieves significantly higher stability of temperature.

Newer, so called "Comb lasers", capable of emitting multiple discrete wavelengths of light, based on quantum dot lasers have been found to be capable of operating at wavelengths of ≥ 80 nm and be unaffected by temperatures between -20 °C and 90 °C, and allow higher accuracy with reduced fluctuations and less relative intensity noise.

Lasers exploiting optically pumped nanocrystal quantum dots as their active medium exhibit device performance that is closer to solid-state lasers than to injection lasers. One challenge in lasers based on nanocrystal quantum dots is the presence of multicarrier Auger processes which increases the nonradiative transitions rates. In contrast to bulk semiconductors, the Auger processes rates can be controlled to some degree in nanocrystal quantum dots.

In development are colloidal quantum dot lasers, which would use quantum confinement to change the optical properties of the semiconductor crystals (≤ 10 nm in diameter) through solution-based rearrangements of quantum dots. Self-assembly of colloidal quantum dots into microsized supraparticle aggregates has demonstrated lasing through the whispering-gallery modes that arise at the spherical boundary. These quantum dot lasers have proven to be recyclable, with high performance at thresholds as low as 100 μJ·cm^{−2}.

== See also ==
- List of laser articles
