= Quantum well laser =

Laser diode in which the active region is so narrow that quantum confinement occurs

A quantum-well laser is a laser diode in which the active region of the device is so narrow that quantum confinement occurs. Laser diodes are formed in compound semiconductor materials that (quite unlike silicon) are able to emit light efficiently. The wavelength of the light emitted by a quantum-well laser is determined by the width of the active region rather than just the bandgap of the materials from which it is constructed. This means that much shorter wavelengths can be obtained from quantum-well lasers than from conventional laser diodes using a particular semiconductor material. The efficiency of a quantum-well laser is also greater than a conventional laser diode due to the stepwise form of its density of states function.

== Origin of the concept of quantum wells ==
In 1972, Charles H. Henry, a physicist and newly appointed Head of the Semiconductor Electronics Research Department at Bell Laboratories, had a keen interest in the subject of integrated optics, the fabrication of optical circuits in which the light travels in waveguides.

Later that year while pondering the physics of waveguides, Henry had a profound insight. He realized that a double heterostructure is not only a waveguide for light waves, but simultaneously for electron waves. Henry was drawing upon the principles of quantum mechanics, according to which electrons behave both as particles and as waves. He perceived a complete analogy between the confinement of light by a waveguide and the confinement of electrons by the potential well that is formed from the difference in bandgaps in a double heterostructure.

C.H. Henry realized that, just as there are discrete modes in which light travels within a waveguide, there should be discrete electron wavefunction modes in the potential well, each having a unique energy level. His estimate showed that if the active layer of the heterostructure is as thin as several tens of nanometers, the electron energy levels would be split apart by tens of milli-electron volts. This amount of energy level splitting is observable. The structure Henry analyzed is today called a "quantum well."

Henry proceeded to calculate how this "quantization" (i.e., the existence of discrete electron wavefunctions and discrete electron energy levels) would alter the optical absorption properties (the absorption "edge") of these semiconductors. He realized that, instead of the optical absorption increasing smoothly as it does in ordinary semiconductors, the absorption of a thin heterostructure (when plotted versus photon energy) would appear as a series of steps.

The quantum well laser is a type of double-heterostructure laser that is based on a two-dimensional active medium. The first double-heterostructure laser (that was based on a bulk active medium) was actually proposed in 1963 by Herbert Kroemer and simultaneously (in 1963) by Zh. I. Alferov and R. F. Kazarinov in the U.S.S.R. Alferov and Kroemer shared a Nobel Prize in 2000 for their work on semiconductor heterostructures.

== Experimental verification of quantum wells ==
In early 1973, Henry proposed to Raymond Dingle, a physicist in his department, that he look for these predicted steps. The very thin heterostructures were made by W. Wiegmann using molecular beam epitaxy. The dramatic effect of the steps was observed in the ensuing experiment, published in 1974.

== Invention ==
After this experiment showed the reality of the predicted quantum-well energy levels, Henry tried to think of an application. He realized that the quantum-well structure would alter the density of states of the semiconductor, and result in an improved semiconductor laser requiring fewer electrons and electron holes to reach laser threshold. Also, he realized that the laser wavelength could be changed merely by changing the thickness of the thin quantum well layers, whereas in the conventional laser a change in wavelength requires a change in layer composition. Such a laser, he reasoned, would have superior performance characteristics compared to the standard double-heterostructure lasers being made at that time.

Dingle and Henry received a patent on this new type of semiconductor laser comprising a pair of wide bandgap layers having an active region sandwiched between them, in which "the active layers are thin enough (e.g., about 1 to 50 nanometres) to separate the quantum levels of electrons confined therein. These lasers exhibit wavelength tunability by changing the thickness of the active layers. Also described is the possibility of threshold reductions resulting from modification of the density of electron states." The patent was issued on September 21, 1976, entitled "Quantum Effects in Heterostructure Lasers," U.S. Patent No. 3,982,207.

Quantum-well lasers require fewer electrons and holes to reach threshold than conventional double-heterostructure lasers. A well-designed quantum-well laser can have an exceedingly low threshold current.

Moreover, since quantum efficiency (photons-out per electrons-in) is largely limited by optical absorption by the electrons and holes, very high quantum efficiencies can be achieved with the quantum-well laser.

To compensate for the reduction in active layer thickness, a small number of identical quantum wells are often used. This is called a multi-quantum-well laser.

== Early demonstrations ==
While the term "quantum-well laser" was coined in the late 1970s by Nick Holonyak and his students at the University of Illinois at Urbana Champaign, the first observation of quantum well laser operation was made in 1975 at Bell Laboratories. The first electrically pumped "injection" quantum-well laser was observed by P. Daniel Dapkus and Russell D. Dupuis of Rockwell International, in collaboration with the University of Illinois at Urbana Champaign (Holonyak) group in 1977. Dapkus and Dupuis had, by then, pioneered the metalorganic vapour phase epitaxy MOVPE (also known as OMCVD, OMVPE, and MOCVD) technique for fabricating semiconductor layers. The MOVPE technique, at the time, provided superior radiative efficiency as compared to the molecular beam epitaxy (MBE) used by Bell Labs. Later, however, Won T. Tsang at Bell Laboratories succeeded in using MBE techniques in the late 1970s and early 1980s to demonstrate dramatic improvements in performance of quantum-well lasers. Tsang showed that, when quantum wells are optimized, they have exceedingly low threshold current and very high efficiency in converting current-in to light-out, making them ideal for widespread use.

The original 1975 demonstration of optically pumped quantum-well lasers had threshold power density of 35 kW/cm^{2}. Ultimately, it was found that the lowest practical threshold current density in any quantum-well laser is 40 A/cm^{2}, a reduction of approximately 1,000x.

Extensive work has been performed on quantum-well lasers based on gallium arsenide and indium phosphide wafers. Today, however, lasers utilizing quantum wells and the discrete electron modes researched by C.H. Henry during the early 1970s, fabricated by both MOVPE and MBE techniques, are produced at a variety of wavelengths from the ultraviolet to the THz regime. The shortest wavelength lasers rely on gallium nitride-based materials. The longest wavelength lasers rely on the quantum-cascade laser design.

The story of the origin of the quantum-well concept, its experimental verification, and the invention of the quantum-well laser is told by Henry in more detail in the foreword to "Quantum Well Lasers," ed. by Peter S. Zory, Jr.

== Creation of the Internet ==
Quantum-well lasers are important because they are the basic active element (laser-light source) of the Internet's fiber-optic communication backbone. Early work on these lasers focused on GaAs gallium arsenide based wells bounded by Al–GaAs walls, but wavelengths transmitted by optical fibers are best achieved with indium phosphide walls with indium gallium arsenide phosphide based wells. The central practical issue of light sources buried in cables is their lifetimes to burn-out. The average burn-out time of early quantum-well lasers was less than one second, so that many early scientific successes were achieved using rare lasers with burn-out times of days or weeks. Commercial success was achieved by Lucent (a spin-off from Bell Laboratories) in the early 1990s with quality control of quantum-well laser production by MOVPE Metalorganic vapour phase epitaxy, as done using high-resolution X rays by Joanna (Joka) Maria Vandenberg. Her quality control produced communications laser diodes with median burn-out times longer than 25 years.

Multiple Quantum Well III-nitride diodes feature an overlapping region between the wavelengths they emit and detect. This allows them to be simultaneously used as both a transmitter and a receiver to create a multi-channel communication link over the air through a single optical path.

== Quantum wire and quantum dot lasers ==
Further improvements in laser efficiency have also been demonstrated by reducing a quantum well(s) to a layer(s) with quantum wires and especially quantum dots.
