= Charles H. Henry =

American physicist

- Born: 6 May 1937; Chicago, Illinois, United States
- Died: 16 September 2016 (aged 79)
- Education: University of Chicago (MS); University of Illinois (PhD)
- Scientific career
- Workplaces: Bell Laboratories

Charles H. Henry (May 6, 1937 – September 16, 2016) was an American physicist. He was born in Chicago, Illinois. He received an M.S. degree in physics in 1959 from the University of Chicago, and a Ph.D. degree in physics in 1965 from the University of Illinois, under the direction of Charlie Slichter. In March 2008, he was featured in an article in the Physics Illinois News, a publication of the Physics Department of the University of Illinois.

Henry's entire professional career was spent in the research area of Bell Laboratories in Murray Hill, New Jersey. He joined Bell Laboratories in 1965 as a member of technical staff. From 1971 to 1975, he was head of the Semiconductor Electronics Research Department. He retired from Lucent Technologies Bell Laboratories in 1997 as a Distinguished Member of Technical Staff. He published 133 technical papers and held 28 patents, including a 1976 patent covering what is now called the quantum well laser.

Throughout his career, Henry worked at the forefront of semiconductor-based optical technologies and science: light-emitting diodes, semiconductor lasers, and photonic integrated circuits. He was an inventor as well as an experimenter, with a particular interest in understanding the theory underlying semiconductor optical devices.

== Quantum wells ==
The idea of the quantum well occurred to Henry in late 1972. While thinking about optical waveguides, Henry suddenly realized that a double heterostructure is a waveguide for electrons, and that a heterostructure with a thin central active layer would have discrete electron modes. Such a heterostructure was later named a quantum well, and the modes are the electron states of the quantum well.

Henry further realized that these discrete electron states would greatly alter the optical absorption edge of the semiconductor. Instead of the absorption being a smooth curve steeply rising with optical energy, it would consist of a series of steps.

In early 1973, he proposed to Raymond Dingle that he look for these steps, and they were observed and reported in 1974 in a paper the pair wrote with W. Wiegmann.

After Dingle's experiment showed the reality of Henry's predicted quantum effects, Henry realized that the quantum well structure would alter the density of states of the semiconductor and result in an improved semiconductor laser. He also realized that the laser wavelength could be changed merely by changing the thickness of the thin quantum well layers, whereas in a conventional laser, a change in wavelength requires a change in layer composition.

On March 7, 1975, Henry and Dingle filed a patent entitled "Quantum Effects in Heterostructure Lasers," which was issued on Sept. 21, 1976. The story of the origin of the quantum well laser is told by Henry in the foreword to Quantum Well Lasers, edited by Peter S. Zory Jr. (1993).

== Other achievements ==
In addition to his seminal work on quantum wells and the invention of the quantum well laser, Henry made a significant contribution to understanding the noise properties of semiconductor lasers. In a widely cited 1982 paper, he introduced M. Lax's "alpha parameter" for the first time into semiconductor laser physics and used it to explain why the linewidth of a semiconductor laser is about 50 times greater than that predicted by the theory of Schawlow and Townes. The alpha parameter, also known as the "Henry factor", remains a basic laser property that aids in understanding a variety of semiconductor laser behaviors.

Early in his career, Henry identified the source of red light emission in gallium phosphide LEDs. In 1968, he and coworkers reported that the red luminescence originated from an electron-hole pair bound to a nearest neighbor donor-acceptor pair composed of zinc and oxygen. Subsequently, red as well as green GaP LEDs were manufactured and used as indicator lights in a variety of applications.

Beginning in the mid-1980s, Henry (with R. F. Kazarinov) initiated a new photonic integrated circuit technology based on silica waveguides fabricated on silicon wafers. Arrayed waveguide grating routers, invented by C. Dragone, were fabricated with this technology and used for wavelength-division multiplexing, the simultaneous transmission of optical signals at different wavelengths over a single optical fiber.

Henry returned to the physics of quantum noise in 1996. With Kazarinov, he published "Quantum Noise in Photonics" (Rev. Mod. Phys. 68, 801–853 [1996]), which explained the physical nature of noise in optical communications. The basic equations governing noise phenomena were derived from first principles and applied to specific examples.

== Awards and honors ==
Henry was a Fellow of the American Physical Society, the Institute of Electrical and Electronics Engineers, and the American Association for the Advancement of Science, and was a member of Sigma Xi.

Henry received the Morton Award (1999, IEEE), the Charles Hard Townes Award (1999, Optical Society of America), and the Prize for Industrial Applications of Physics (2001, American Institute of Physics). He was the recipient of an Alumni Award for Distinguished Service from the University of Illinois College of Engineering (2001).

In September, 2012, Henry was inducted into the University of Illinois's Engineering Hall of Fame.

== Personal life ==
Henry was born and raised in Chicago, where he met his wife, Helene. They lived for many years in New Jersey, retiring to North Carolina in 2005.

He is survived by three children, Ronald, Karen, and Alice.
