= Particle in a ring =

Concept in quantum mechanics

In quantum mechanics, the case of a particle in a one-dimensional ring is similar to the particle in a box. The Schrödinger equation for a free particle which is restricted to a ring (technically, whose configuration space is the circle $S^1$) is

$$-\frac{\hbar^2}{2m}\nabla^2 \psi = E\psi$$

with boundary conditions

$$\psi(\theta + 2 \pi) = \psi(\theta)$$

expressing the fact that the particle is in a ring.

== Wave function ==
Animated wave function of a coherent state consisting of eigenstates n=1 and n=2.

Using polar coordinates on the 1-dimensional ring of radius R, the wave function depends only on the angular coordinate, and so

$$\nabla^2 = \frac{1}{R^2} \frac{\partial^2}{\partial \theta^2}$$

Requiring that the wave function be periodic in $\ \theta$ with a period $2 \pi$ (from the demand that the wave functions be single-valued functions on the circle), and that they be normalized leads to the conditions

$$\int_{0}^{2 \pi} \left| \psi ( \theta ) \right|^2 \, d\theta = 1\$$,

and

$$\ \psi (\theta) = \ \psi ( \theta + 2\pi)$$

Under these conditions, the solution to the Schrödinger equation is given by

$$\psi_{\pm}(\theta) = \frac{1}{\sqrt{2 \pi  }}\, e^{\pm i \frac{R}{\hbar} \sqrt{2 m E} \, \theta }$$

== Energy eigenvalues ==
The energy eigenvalues $E$ are quantized because of the periodic boundary conditions, and they are required to satisfy

$e^{\pm i \frac{R}{\hbar} \sqrt{2 m E} \, \theta } = e^{\pm i \frac{R}{\hbar} \sqrt{2 m E} (\theta +2 \pi)}$ or
$$e^{\pm i 2 \pi \frac{R}{\hbar} \sqrt{2 m E}  } = 1 = e^{i 2 \pi n}$$

The eigenfunction and eigenenergies are

$$\psi(\theta) = \frac{1}{\sqrt{2 \pi}} \, e^{\pm i n \theta }$$
$E_n = \frac{n^2 \hbar^2}{2 m R^2}$ where $n = 0,\pm 1,\pm 2,\pm 3, \ldots$

Therefore, there are two degenerate quantum states for every value of $n>0$ (corresponding to $\ e^{\pm i n \theta}$). Therefore, there are $2n+1$ states with energies up to an energy indexed by the number $n$.

The case of a particle in a one-dimensional ring is an instructive example when studying the quantization of angular momentum for, say, an electron orbiting the nucleus. The azimuthal wave functions in that case are identical to the energy eigenfunctions of the particle on a ring.

The statement that any wavefunction for the particle on a ring can be written as a superposition of energy eigenfunctions is exactly identical to the Fourier theorem about the development of any periodic function in a Fourier series.

This simple model can be used to find approximate energy levels of some ring molecules, such as benzene.

== Application ==
In organic chemistry, aromatic compounds contain atomic rings, such as benzene rings (the Kekulé structure) consisting of five or six, usually carbon, atoms. So does the surface of "buckyballs" (buckminsterfullerene). This ring behaves like a circular waveguide, with the valence electrons orbiting in both directions. To fill all energy levels up to n requires $2\times(2n+1)=4n+2$ electrons, as electrons have additionally two possible orientations of their spins. This gives exceptional stability ("aromatic"), and is known as the Hückel's rule.

Further in rotational spectroscopy this model may be used as an approximation of rotational energy levels.

== See also ==
- Angular momentum
- Harmonic analysis
- One-dimensional periodic case
- Semicircular potential well
- Spherical potential well
