= Band-gap engineering =

Controlling or altering the band gap of a material

Band-gap engineering is the process of controlling or altering the band gap of a material. This is typically done to semiconductors by controlling the composition of alloys, constructing layered materials with alternating compositions, or by inducing strain either epitaxially or topologically. A band gap is the range in a solid where no electron state can exist. The band gap of insulators is much larger than in semiconductors. Conductors or metals have a much smaller or nonexistent band gap than semiconductors since the valence and conduction bands overlap. Controlling the band gap allows for the creation of desirable electrical properties.

== Molecular-beam epitaxy (MBE) ==
Molecular-beam epitaxy is a technique used to construct thin epitaxial films of materials ranging from oxides to semiconductors to metals. Different beams of atoms and molecules in an ultra-high vacuum environment are shot onto a nearly atomically clean crystal, creating a layering effect. This is a type of thin-film deposition. Semiconductors are the most commonly used material due to their use in electronics. Technologies such as quantum well devices, super-lattices, and lasers are possible with MBE. Epitaxial films are useful due to their ability to be produced with electrical properties different from those of the substrate, either higher purity, or fewer defects or with a different concentration of electrically active impurities as desired. Varying the composition of the material alters the band gap due to bonding of different atoms with differing energy level gaps.

== Strain-induced band-gap engineering ==
Semiconducting materials are able to be altered with strain-inducing from tunable sizes and shapes due to quantum confinement effects. A larger tunable bandgap range is possible due to the high elastic limit of semiconducting nanostructures (John M. Guerra, and Guerra and Vezenov). Strain is the ratio of extension to original length, and can be used on the nanoscale.

Thulin and Guerra (2008) theoretically quantified a strain-inducing method that they used to engineer the material properties of anatase titania. They studied its electronic band structure over a range of biaxial strain by utilizing both the density functional theory within the generalized gradient approximation (GGA) and quasiparticle theory calculations within the GW approximation. They found that the strain-modified material is suitable for use as a high efficiency photoanode in a photoelectrochemical cell. They tracked the changes to the band gap and the charge carrier effective masses versus the total pressure associated with the strained lattice. Both the GGA and the GW approximation predict a linear relationship between the change in band gap and the total pressure, but they found that the GGA underestimates the slope by more than 57% with respect to the GW approximation result of 0.0685 eV/GPa.

=== ZnO nanowires ===
ZnO Nanowires are used in nanogenerators, nanowire field effect transistors, piezo-electric diodes, and chemical sensors. Several studies have been conducted on the effect of strain on different physical properties. Sb-doped ZnO nanowires experience variation in resistance when exposed to strain. Bending strain can induce an increase in electrical conductance. Strain can also induce change of transport properties and band-gap variation. By correlating these two effects under experimentation the variation of transport properties as a function of band-gap can be generated. Electrical measurements are obtained using scanning tunnelling microscope-transmission electron microscope probing system.

== Energy band-gap engineering of graphene nanoribbons ==
When lithographically generated graphene ribbons are laterally confined in charge it creates an energy gap near the charge neutrality point. The narrower the ribbons result in larger energy gap openings based on temperature dependent conductance. A narrow ribbon is considered a quasi one dimensional system in which an energy band gap opening is expected. Single sheets of graphene are mechanically extracted from bulk graphite crystals onto a silicon substrate and are contacted with Cr/Au metal electrodes. Hydrogen silsesquioxane is spun onto the samples to form an etch mask and then oxygen plasma is used to etch away the unprotected graphene.
