= Semicircular potential well =

Elementary example of quantum phenomena and the applications of quantum mechanics

In quantum mechanics, the case of a particle in a one-dimensional ring is similar to the particle in a box. The particle follows the path of a semicircle from $0$ to $\pi$ where it cannot escape, because the potential from $\pi$ to $2 \pi$ is infinite. Instead there is total reflection, meaning the particle bounces back and forth between $0$ to $\pi$. The Schrödinger equation for a free particle which is restricted to a semicircle (technically, whose configuration space is the circle $S^1$) is

$$-\frac{\hbar^2}{2m}\nabla^2 \psi = E\psi$$	1

== Wave function ==
Using cylindrical coordinates on the 1-dimensional semicircle, the wave function depends only on the angular coordinate, and so

$$\nabla^2 = \frac{1}{s^2} \frac{\partial^2}{\partial \phi^2}$$	2

Substituting the Laplacian in cylindrical coordinates, the wave function is therefore expressed as

$$-\frac{\hbar^2}{2m s^2} \frac{d^2\psi}{d\phi^2} = E\psi$$	3

The moment of inertia for a semicircle, best expressed in cylindrical coordinates, is $I \ \stackrel{\mathrm{def}}{=}\ \iiint_V r^2 \,\rho(r,\phi,z)\,r dr\,d\phi\,dz \!$. Solving the integral, one finds that the moment of inertia of a semicircle is $I=m s^2$, exactly the same for a hoop of the same radius. The wave function can now be expressed as $-\frac{\hbar^2}{2I} \frac{d^2\psi}{d\phi^2} = E\psi$, which is easily solvable.

Since the particle cannot escape the region from $0$ to $\pi$, the general solution to this differential equation is

$$\psi (\phi) = A \cos(m \phi) + B \sin (m \phi)$$	4

Defining $m=\sqrt {\frac{2 I E}{\hbar^2}}$, we can calculate the energy as $E= \frac{m^2 \hbar ^2}{2I}$. We then apply the boundary conditions, where $\psi$ and $\frac{d\psi}{d\phi}$ are continuous and the wave function is normalizable:

$$\int_{0}^{\pi} \left| \psi ( \phi ) \right|^2 \, d\phi = 1\ .$$	5

Like the infinite square well, the first boundary condition demands that the wave function equals 0 at both $\phi = 0$ and $\phi = \pi$. Basically

$$\ \psi (0) = \psi (\pi) = 0 .$$	6

Since the wave function $\psi(0) = 0$, the coefficient A must equal 0 because $\cos (0) = 1$. The wave function also equals 0 at $\phi= \pi$ so we must apply this boundary condition. Discarding the trivial solution where B=0, the wave function $\psi (\pi) = 0 = B \sin (m \pi)$ only when m is an integer since $\sin (n \pi) = 0$. This boundary condition quantizes the energy where the energy equals $E= \frac{m^2 \hbar ^2}{2I}$ where m is any integer. The condition m=0 is ruled out because $\psi = 0$ everywhere, meaning that the particle is not in the potential at all. Negative integers are also ruled out since they can easily be absorbed in the normalization condition.

We then normalize the wave function, yielding a result where $B= \sqrt{\frac{2}{\pi}}$. The normalized wave function is

$$\psi (\phi) = \sqrt{\frac{2}{\pi}} \sin (m \phi) .$$	7

The ground state energy of the system is $E= \frac{\hbar ^2}{2I}$. Like the particle in a box, there exists nodes in the excited states of the system where both $\psi (\phi)$ and $\psi (\phi) ^2$ are both 0, which means that the probability of finding the particle at these nodes are 0.

== Analysis ==
Since the wave function is only dependent on the azimuthal angle $\phi$, the measurable quantities of the system are the angular position and angular momentum, expressed with the operators $\phi$ and $L_z$ respectively.

Using cylindrical coordinates, the operators $\phi$ and $L_z$ are expressed as $\phi$ and $-i \hbar \frac{d}{d\phi}$ respectively, where these observables play a role similar to position and momentum for the particle in a box. The commutation and uncertainty relations for angular position and angular momentum are given as follows:

$$[\phi, L_z] = i \hbar \ \psi(\phi)$$	8

$$(\Delta \phi) (\Delta L_z) \geq \frac{\hbar}{2}$$ where $\Delta_{\psi} \phi = \sqrt{\langle {\phi}^2\rangle_\psi - \langle {\phi}\rangle_\psi ^2}$ and $\Delta_{\psi} L_z = \sqrt{\langle {L_z}^2\rangle_\psi - \langle {L_z}\rangle_\psi ^2}$	9

== Boundary conditions ==
As with all quantum mechanics problems, if the boundary conditions are changed so does the wave function. If a particle is confined to the motion of an entire ring ranging from 0 to $2 \pi$, the particle is subject only to a periodic boundary condition (see particle in a ring). If a particle is confined to the motion of $- \frac{\pi}{2}$ to $\frac{\pi}{2}$, the issue of even and odd parity becomes important.

The wave equation for such a potential is given as:

$$\psi_{\rm o} (\phi) = \sqrt{\frac{2}{\pi}} \cos (m \phi)$$	10

$$\psi_{\rm e} (\phi) = \sqrt{\frac{2}{\pi}} \sin (m \phi)$$	11

where $\psi_{\rm o} (\phi)$ and $\psi_{\rm e} (\phi)$ are for odd and even m respectively.

Similarly, if the semicircular potential well is a finite well, the solution will resemble that of the finite potential well where the angular operators $\phi$ and $L_z$ replace the linear operators x and p.

== See also ==
- Particle in a ring
- Particle in a box
- Finite potential well
- Delta function potential
- Gas in a box
- Particle in a spherically symmetric potential
