= Joanna Maria Vandenberg =

Dutch solid state chemist and crystallographer

Joanna (Joka) Maria Vandenberg (born 1938) is a Dutch solid state chemist and crystallographer who immigrated to the United States in 1968. At Bell Telephone Laboratories, she made a major contribution to the success of the Internet. She invented, developed, and applied the X-ray scanning tool for quality control essential to manufacturing indium gallium arsenide phosphide-based multi-quantum well lasers. These are the lasers that amplify and modulate light that travels through optical fibers that are at the heart of today's Internet.

== Early life ==
Personal Life: Joanna Vandenberg was born January 24, 1938, in Heemstede, a small town near Amsterdam, where she was the youngest of a family of five, and the first one to go to college. Her family was in the tulip business. In 1956 she graduated cum laude from gymnasium-β and went to the State University of Leiden in the Netherlands where she received a B.S. in Physical Sciences and Mathematics, 1959 and a M.S. in Inorganic and Solid State Chemistry with A. E. van Arkel as well as Theoretical Chemistry, 1962. She studied with van Arkel in Leiden and Caroline H. MacGillavry in Amsterdam for a Ph.D. thesis on X-ray diffraction analysis of metal–metal bonding in inorganic compounds, 1964. She moved to the USA in 1968 after marrying her first husband, Rudolf H. Voorhoeve, who started a career at Bell Telephone Laboratories Murray Hill NJ.They had two children, Lucy and Niels, and three grandchildren. She married for the second time to James C. Phillips. She met him at Bell Telephone Laboratories, Murray Hill NJ.

== Career ==
She worked for 4 years (1964–1968) at Royal Dutch Shell laboratory in Amsterdam, where she joined the research group on catalytic properties of transition metal-layered chalcogenides. In 1968 she moved to Bell Laboratories where she continued work on structural and magnetic properties of transition-metal chalcogenides. Her career was interrupted when she was laid off seven months into her first pregnancy. She was rehired in 1972 after the AT&T operators won a historic class action lawsuit for being fired when pregnant. With Bernd Matthias of UCSD, she started to work on metal cluster formation in superconducting ternary transition metal compounds.^{[Science]} Her extensive knowledge of structural inorganic chemistry enabled her to predict inorganic crystal structures and led to the discovery the superconducting rare earth ternary borides.^{[PNAS]}

In 1980 she changed direction and began research on contact metallization on InGaAsP/InP multi-quantum well layers used as high speed digital lasers in the internet. She designed a temperature-dependent in-situ annealing X-ray diffractometer. This technique made it possible to optimize the electrical behavior of the gold metallization contacts^{[JAP82]}^{[JAP84]} and became a standard reference in semiconductor industry.

In 1986 Vandenberg turned her attention to the quality control of the crystal growth of InGaAsP multi-quantum well (MQW) layers, used as laser light sources and optical modulators designed to work in the 1.3 to 1.55 μm wavelength range. Advancing the design, performance and manufacturability of these devices had been the focus of all the leading optical component suppliers for decades. These devices are manufactured using organometallic vapor phase epitaxy, a complex process involving multiple sources subject to drift. Manufacture of early devices was based on unacceptably low (much less than 1%) end-to-end yields. Dramatic improvement was needed to produce the high performance components used to transport the massive amounts of data in today's Internet. In many cases mono-layer thickness control is required along with variations in bandgap less than 0.5%. This high level of quality control must be achieved using complex crystal growth machines which can fail in hundreds of ways. To insure that these multiple failure modes do not impact the final device, Vandenberg designed a one-room (later bench-top) non-destructive high-resolution X-ray diffractometer^{[JAP87]}^{[JAP89]} to provide immediate on-line feedback into the MQW growth process. She constructed robust algorithms linking X-ray features to layer thickness and strain information essential to crystal growth control and optoelectronic device performance. Her X-ray diffraction technique is used to scan every laser wafer many times during manufacture. All Internet lasers are now manufactured using her tool X-Ray Crystallography, and their operational lifetime exceeds 25 years.

== Awards ==
Vandenberg received the 1995 and 1997 Optoelectronics Award in recognition of contributions to the development of characterization and process control routines for manufacture of Lucent's world class semiconductor lasers. She is a fellow of the American Physical Society and a corresponding member of the Royal Netherlands Academy of Arts and Sciences.

== Selected publications ==
- Vandenberg, JM; Matthias, BT (1977). "Clustering hypothesis of some high-temperature superconductors". Science. 198 (4313): 194–196. Bibcode:1977Sci...198..194V. doi:10.1126/science.198.4313.194. PMID 17755364. S2CID 46467993.
- Vandenberg, JM; Matthias, BT (1977). "Crystallography of new ternary borides". Proceedings of the National Academy of Sciences of the United States of America. 74 (4): 1336–1337. Bibcode:1977PNAS...74.1336V. doi:10.1073/pnas.74.4.1336. PMC 430747. PMID 16578752.
- Vandenberg, JM; Temkin, H; Hamm, RA; DiGiuseppe, MA (1982). "Structural study of alloyed gold metallization contacts on InGaAsP/InP layers". Journal of Applied Physics. 53 (11): 7385–7389. Bibcode:1982JAP....53.7385V. doi:10.1063/1.330364.
- Vandenberg, JM; Temkin, H (1984). "An in situ x-ray study of gold/barrier-metal interactions with InGaAsP/InP layers". Journal of Applied Physics. 55 (10): 3676–3681. Bibcode:1984JAP....55.3676V. doi:10.1063/1.332918.
- Vandenberg, JM; Hamm, RA; Panish, MB; Temkin, H (1987). "High-resolution x-ray diffraction studies of InGaAs(P)/InP superlattices grown by gas-source molecular-beam epitaxy". Journal of Applied Physics. 62 (4): 1278–1283. Bibcode:1987JAP....62.1278V. doi:10.1063/1.339681.
- Vandenberg, JM; Gershoni, D; Hamm, RA; Panish, MB; Temkin, H (1989). "Structural perfection of InGaAs/InP strained-layer superlattices grown by gas source molecular-beam epitaxy: A high-resolution x-ray diffraction study". Journal of Applied Physics. 66 (8): 3635–3638. Bibcode:1989JAP....66.3635V. doi:10.1063/1.344072.
