= Double heterostructure =

A double heterostructure, sometimes called double heterojunction, is formed when two semiconductor materials are grown into a "sandwich". One material (such as AlGaAs) is used for the outer layers (or cladding), and another of smaller band gap (such as GaAs) is used for the inner layer. In this example, there are two AlGaAs-GaAs junctions (or boundaries), one at each side of the inner layer. There must be two boundaries for the device to be a double heterostructure. If there was only one side of cladding material, the device would be a simple, or single, heterostructure.

The double heterostructure is a very useful structure in optoelectronic devices and has interesting electronic properties. If one of the cladding layers is p-doped, the other cladding layer n-doped and the smaller energy gap semiconductor material undoped, a p-i-n structure is formed. When a current is applied to the ends of the pin structure, electrons and holes are injected into the heterostructure. The smaller energy gap material forms energy discontinuities at the boundaries, confining the electrons and holes to the smaller energy gap semiconductor. The electrons and holes recombine in the intrinsic semiconductor emitting photons. If the width of the intrinsic region is reduced to the order of the de Broglie wavelength, the energies in the intrinsic region no longer become continuous but become discrete. (Actually, they are not continuous but the energy levels are very close together so we think of them as being continuous.) In this situation the double heterostructure becomes a quantum well.
