= Relative intensity noise =

Relative intensity noise (RIN), describes the instability in the power level of a laser. The noise term is important to describe lasers used in fiber-optic communication and LIDAR remote sensing.

Relative intensity noise can be generated from cavity vibration, fluctuations in the laser gain medium or simply from transferred intensity noise from a pump source. Since intensity noise typically is proportional to the intensity, the relative intensity noise is typically independent of laser power. Hence, when the signal to noise ratio (SNR) is limited by RIN, it does not depend on laser power. In contrast, when SNR is limited by shot noise, it improves with increasing laser power. RIN typically peaks at the relaxation oscillation frequency of the laser then falls off at higher frequencies until it converges to the shot noise level. The roll off frequency sets what is specified as the RIN bandwidth. RIN is sometimes referred to as a kind of 1/f noise otherwise known as pink noise.

Relative intensity noise is measured by sampling the output current of a photodetector over time and transforming this data set into frequency with a fast Fourier transform. Alternatively, it can be measured by analyzing the spectrum of the photodetected signal using an electrical spectrum analyzer. Noise observed in the electrical domain is proportional to electric current squared and hence to optical power squared. Therefore, RIN is usually presented as relative fluctuation in the square of the optical power in decibels per hertz over the RIN bandwidth and at one or several optical intensities. It may also be specified as a percentage, a value that represents the relative fluctuations per Hz multiplied by the RIN bandwidth.

== See also ==
- Shot noise

== External reference ==
- Intensity noise in Encyclopedia of Laser Physics and Technology
- Relative Intensity Noise in Encyclopedia of Laser Physics and Technology
