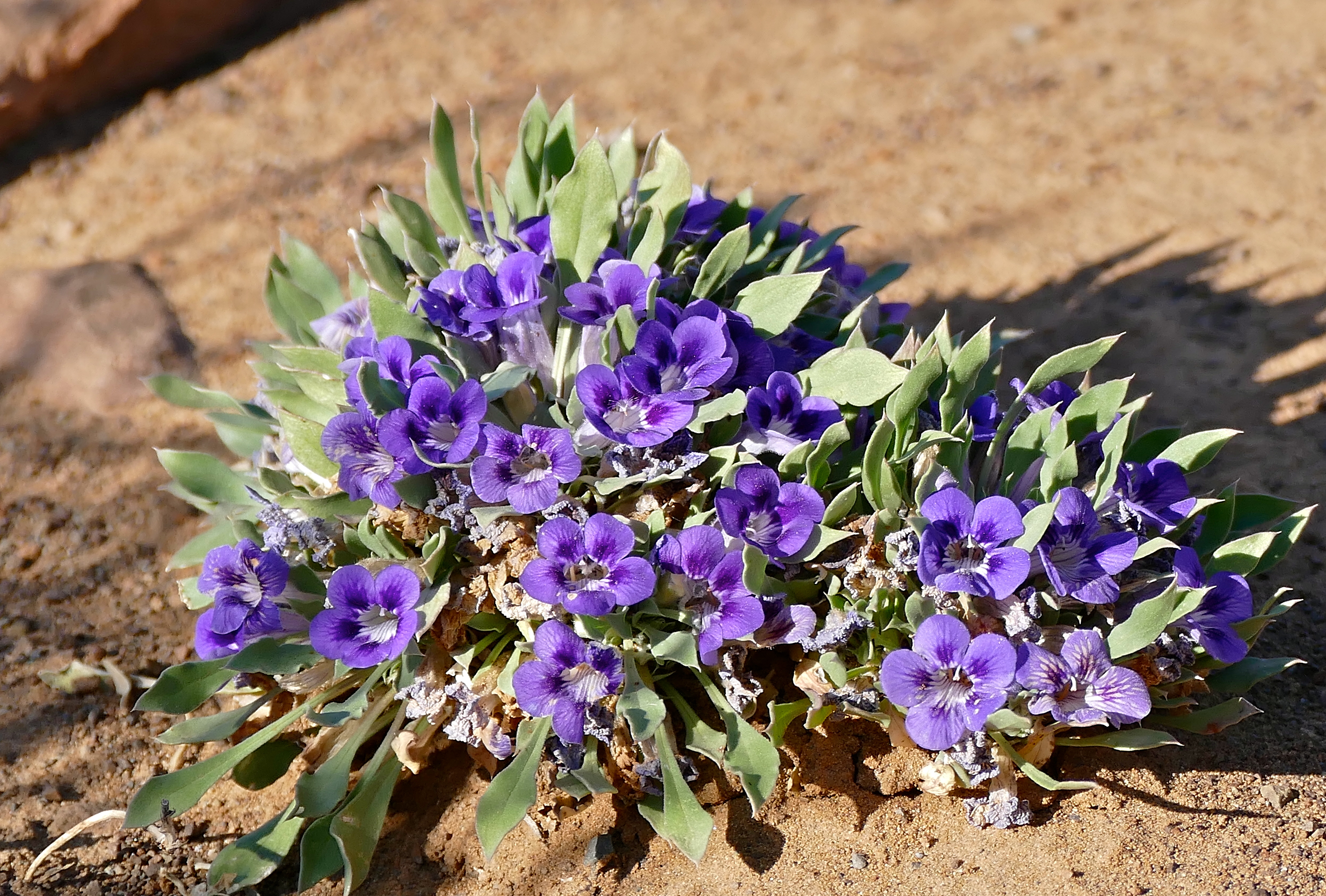

Scientific classification
- Kingdom: Plantae
- Clade: Tracheophytes
- Clade: Angiosperms
- Clade: Eudicots
- Clade: Asterids
- Order: Lamiales
- Family: Scrophulariaceae
- Genus: Aptosimum
- Species: A. indivisum

Binomial name
- Aptosimum indivisum Burch., 1822

Synonyms
- Aptosimum rosulata Nees ex Benth. Aptosimum nanum Engl.

= Aptosimum indivisum =

Species of plant

Aptosimum indivisum, the Karoo violet, belonging to the genus Aptosimum. It was first described by William John Burchell.
