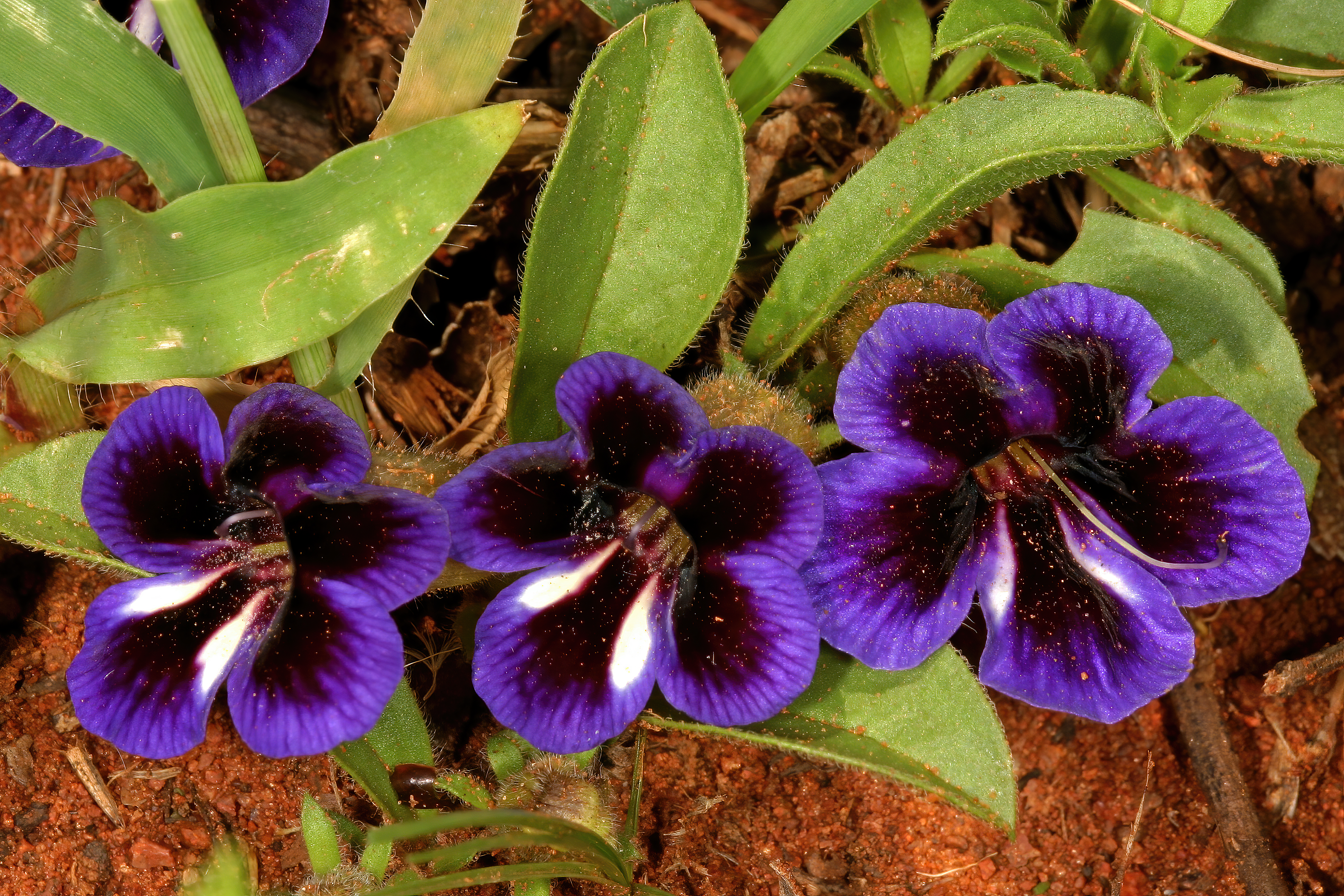

Scientific classification
- Kingdom: Plantae
- Clade: Tracheophytes
- Clade: Angiosperms
- Clade: Eudicots
- Clade: Asterids
- Order: Lamiales
- Family: Scrophulariaceae
- Genus: Aptosimum
- Species: A. elongatum

Binomial name
- Aptosimum elongatum (Hiern) Engl.

Synonyms
- Aptosimum depressum var. elongatum Hiern; Aptosimum procumbens var. elongatum (Hiern) Codd; Aptosimum eriocephalum var. pubescens Engl. ex Emil Weber; Aptosimum pubescens Emil Weber; Aptosimum weberianum Pilg.

= Aptosimum elongatum =

Species of plant

Aptosimum elongatum is a species of plant belonging to the genus Aptosimum.
