= Aptosimum tragacanthoides =

Scientific classification
- Kingdom: Plantae
- Clade: Tracheophytes
- Clade: Angiosperms
- Clade: Eudicots
- Clade: Asterids
- Order: Lamiales
- Family: Scrophulariaceae
- Genus: Aptosimum
- Species: A. tragacanthoides

Binomial name
- Aptosimum tragacanthoides E.Mey. ex Benth., 1836

Species of plant

Aptosimum tragacanthoides is a species of flowering plant in the family Scrophulariaceae. It is native to Southern Africa.
