= Aptosimum molle =

Scientific classification
- Kingdom: Plantae
- Clade: Tracheophytes
- Clade: Angiosperms
- Clade: Eudicots
- Clade: Asterids
- Order: Lamiales
- Family: Scrophulariaceae
- Genus: Aptosimum
- Species: A. molle

Binomial name
- Aptosimum molle Skan

Species of plant

Aptosimum molle is a flowering plant species in the genus Aptosimum, which is native to dry tropical and Southern Africa. It belongs to the family Scrophulariaceae. While specific characteristics for A. molle are not widely available, it is related to other species in the genus, which include plants with blue or violet trumpet-shaped flowers and leaves that vary in shape.
