= Aptosimum decumbens =

Scientific classification
- Kingdom: Plantae
- Clade: Tracheophytes
- Clade: Angiosperms
- Clade: Eudicots
- Clade: Asterids
- Order: Lamiales
- Family: Scrophulariaceae
- Genus: Aptosimum
- Species: A. decumbens

Binomial name
- Aptosimum decumbens Schinz

Species of plant

Aptosimum decumbens is a perennial herb or subshrub belonging to the genus Aptosimum, known for its sprawling, low-growing form and violet-blue, trumpet-shaped flowers. It is a drought-tolerant species found in dry, open habitats.
