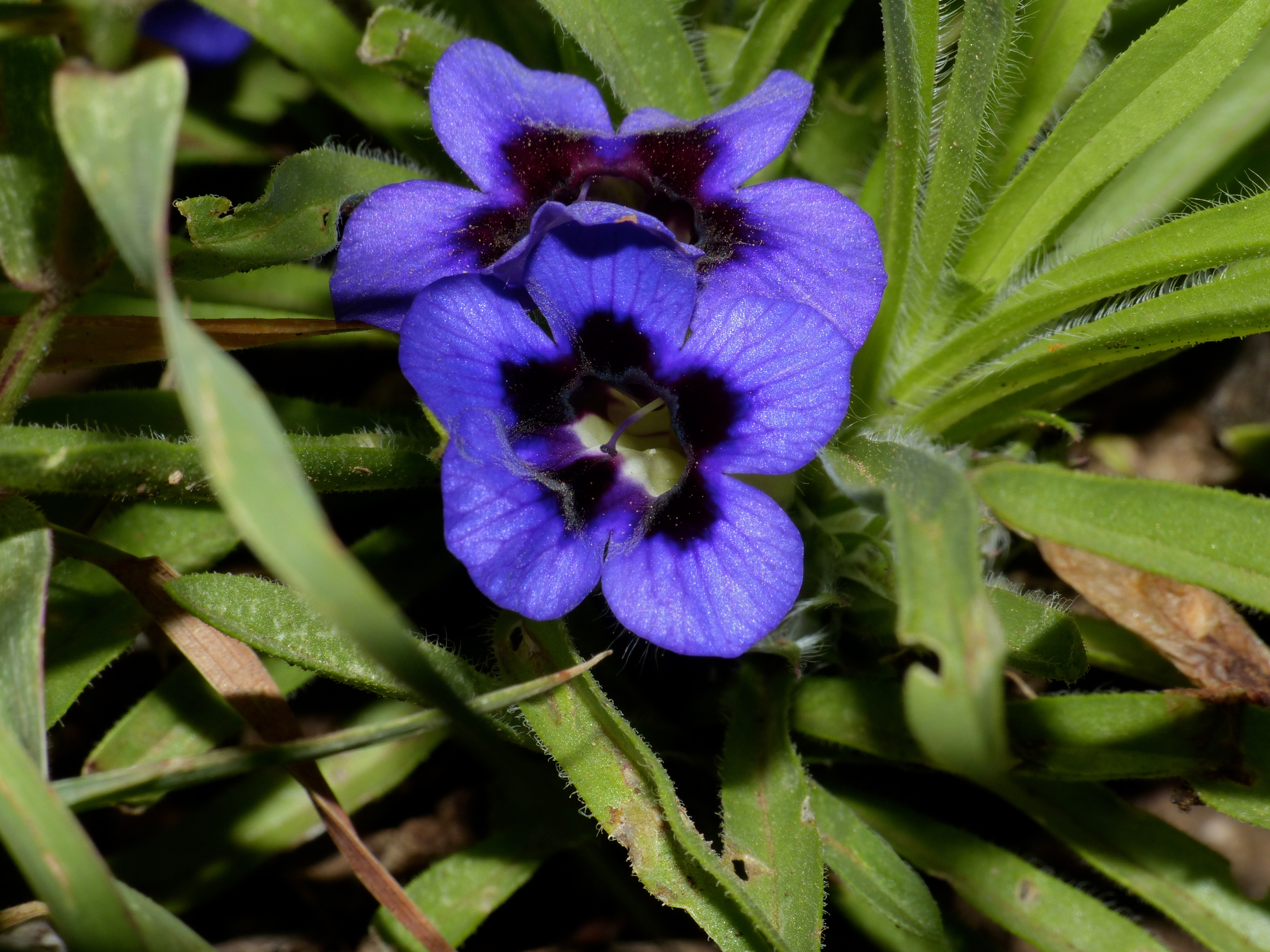

Scientific classification
- Kingdom: Plantae
- Clade: Tracheophytes
- Clade: Angiosperms
- Clade: Eudicots
- Clade: Asterids
- Order: Lamiales
- Family: Scrophulariaceae
- Genus: Aptosimum
- Species: A. lineare

Binomial name
- Aptosimum lineare Marloth & Engl.

Synonyms
- Heterotypic Synonyms: Aptosimum lineare var. acaule Emil Weber; Aptosimum lineare var. angolense Emil Weber; Aptosimum lineare var. ciliatum Emil Weber; Aptosimum lineare var. randii (S.Moore) Emil Weber; Aptosimum nelsii Emil Weber; Aptosimum randii S.Moore

= Aptosimum lineare =

Species of plant

Aptosimum lineare is a species of flowering plant in the family Scrophulariaceae.
