= Aptosimum neglectum =

Scientific classification
- Kingdom: Plantae
- Clade: Embryophytes
- Clade: Tracheophytes
- Clade: Spermatophytes
- Clade: Angiosperms
- Clade: Eudicots
- Clade: Asterids
- Order: Lamiales
- Family: Scrophulariaceae
- Genus: Aptosimum
- Species: A. neglectum

Binomial name
- Aptosimum neglectum E.Web.

Species of plant

Aptosimum neglectum is a species of plant in the genus Aptosimum endemic to the Northern Cape Province of South Africa.

== Conservation status ==
This species is incredibly rare but also considered least concern by the SANBI database.

== Sightings ==
The only confirmed living record of this species is a research grade iNaturalist observation taken by Adam Welz on the very border of its range.
