= Aptosimum pumilum =

Scientific classification
- Kingdom: Plantae
- Clade: Tracheophytes
- Clade: Angiosperms
- Clade: Eudicots
- Clade: Asterids
- Order: Lamiales
- Family: Scrophulariaceae
- Genus: Aptosimum
- Species: A. pumilum

Binomial name
- Aptosimum pumilum (Hochst.) Benth., 1846

Species of plant

Aptosimum pumilum is a species of flowering plant in the genus Aptosimum. It is a member of the family, Scrophulariaceae.
