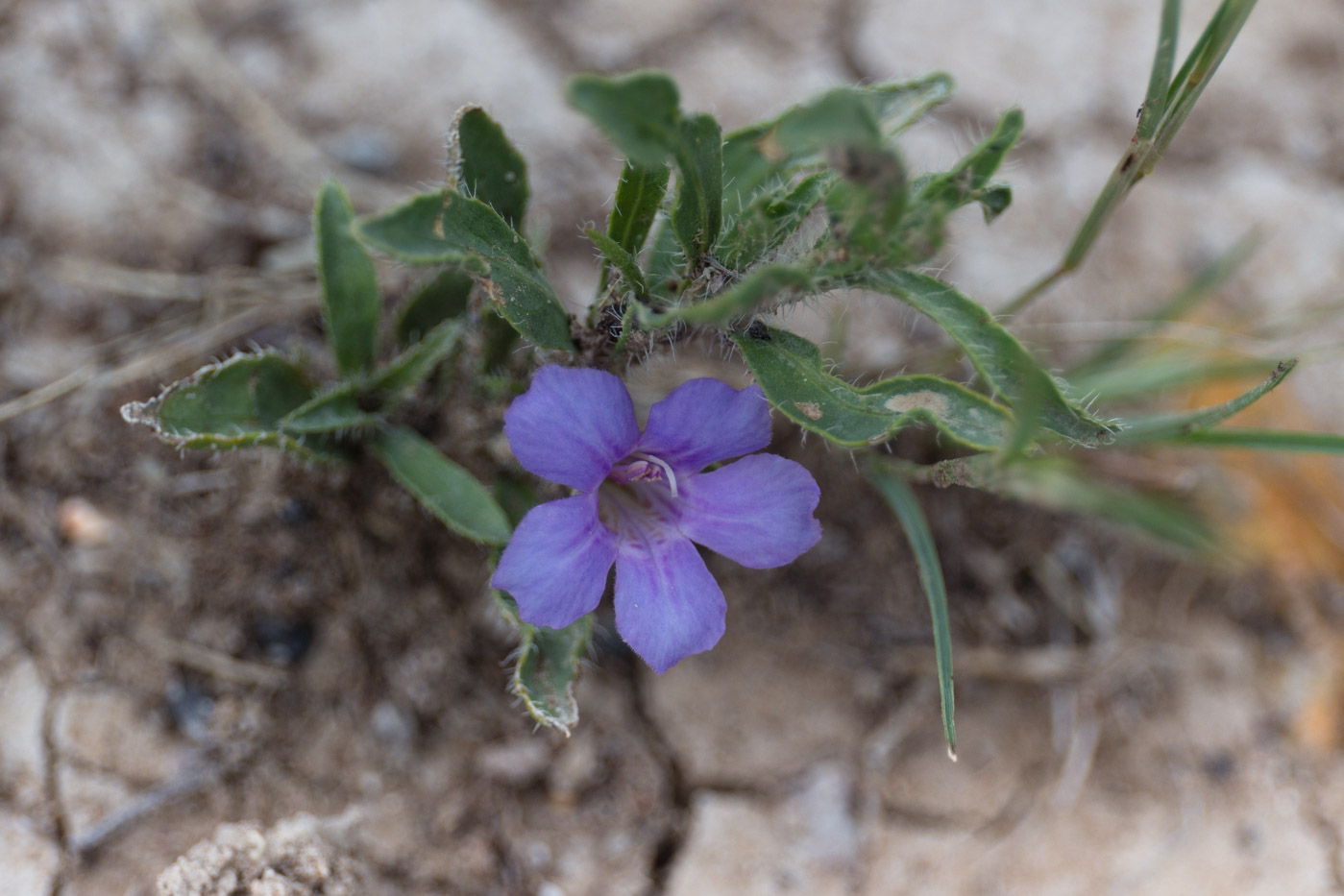

Scientific classification
- Kingdom: Plantae
- Clade: Tracheophytes
- Clade: Angiosperms
- Clade: Eudicots
- Clade: Asterids
- Order: Lamiales
- Family: Scrophulariaceae
- Genus: Aptosimum
- Species: A. arenarium

Binomial name
- Aptosimum arenarium Engl., 1888

= Aptosimum arenarium =

Species of plant

Aptosimum arenarium is a species of plant belonging to the genus Aptosimum. The species is endemic to Namibia.
