= Aptosimum viscosum =

Scientific classification
- Kingdom: Plantae
- Clade: Tracheophytes
- Clade: Angiosperms
- Clade: Eudicots
- Clade: Asterids
- Order: Lamiales
- Family: Scrophulariaceae
- Genus: Aptosimum
- Species: A. viscosum

Binomial name
- Aptosimum viscosum Benth.

Species of plant

Aptosimum viscosum is a plant species in the genus Aptosimum, native to South Africa, and is classified within the family Scrophulariaceae.
