= Aptosimum transvaalense =

Scientific classification
- Kingdom: Plantae
- Clade: Tracheophytes
- Clade: Angiosperms
- Clade: Eudicots
- Clade: Asterids
- Order: Lamiales
- Family: Scrophulariaceae
- Genus: Aptosimum
- Species: A. transvaalense

Binomial name
- Aptosimum transvaalense E.Weber

Species of plant

Aptosimum transvaalense is a shrub endemic to the Limpopo province of South Africa, belonging to the genus Aptosimum within the Scrophulariaceae family.
