= Aptosimum radiatum =

Scientific classification
- Kingdom: Plantae
- Clade: Tracheophytes
- Clade: Angiosperms
- Clade: Eudicots
- Clade: Asterids
- Order: Lamiales
- Family: Scrophulariaceae
- Genus: Aptosimum
- Species: A. radiatum

Binomial name
- Aptosimum radiatum Kolberg, Slageren

Species of plant

Aptosimum radiatum is a species of flowering plant in the Scrophulariaceae family, native to dry tropical and Southern Africa. It was described as a new species from Namibia in 2016 and is also found in the Northern Cape region of South Africa. The species is not considered to be at risk of extinction, although it faces some threats from agriculture and invasive plants in parts of its range.
