= Aptosimum gossweileri =

Scientific classification
- Kingdom: Plantae
- Clade: Tracheophytes
- Clade: Angiosperms
- Clade: Eudicots
- Clade: Asterids
- Order: Lamiales
- Family: Scrophulariaceae
- Genus: Aptosimum
- Species: A. gossweileri

Binomial name
- Aptosimum gossweileri Skan

Species of plant

Aptosimum gossweileri is a species of flowering plant in the family Scrophulariaceae. It is a robust, glandular-pilose undershrub with long, procumbent, many-branched stems and thick, fleshy leaves that have a persistent midrib, which can form a straight, stout spine. The species is found in dry tropical and Southern Africa and is characterized by its axillary flowers that are typically clustered in pairs, with glandular-pubescent, blue to purple corollas.
