= Aptosimum welwitschii =

Scientific classification
- Kingdom: Plantae
- Clade: Tracheophytes
- Clade: Angiosperms
- Clade: Eudicots
- Clade: Asterids
- Order: Lamiales
- Family: Scrophulariaceae
- Genus: Aptosimum
- Species: A. welwitschii

Binomial name
- Aptosimum welwitschii Hiern

Species of plant

Aptosimum welwitschii is a species of flowering plant in the family Scrophulariaceae, native to dry regions of Africa, particularly Angola. It is a spiny undershrub characterized by branched, decumbent to ascending stems with spiny growth, and linear-oblanceolate, hairy leaves. The plant features solitary, subsessile flowers and produces capsules containing seeds.
