= Aptosimum suberosum =

Scientific classification
- Kingdom: Plantae
- Clade: Tracheophytes
- Clade: Angiosperms
- Clade: Eudicots
- Clade: Asterids
- Order: Lamiales
- Family: Scrophulariaceae
- Genus: Aptosimum
- Species: A. suberosum

Binomial name
- Aptosimum suberosum E.Web.

Species of plant

Aptosimum suberosum is a species of flowering plant in the genus Aptosimum and belonging to the family Scrophulariaceae.
