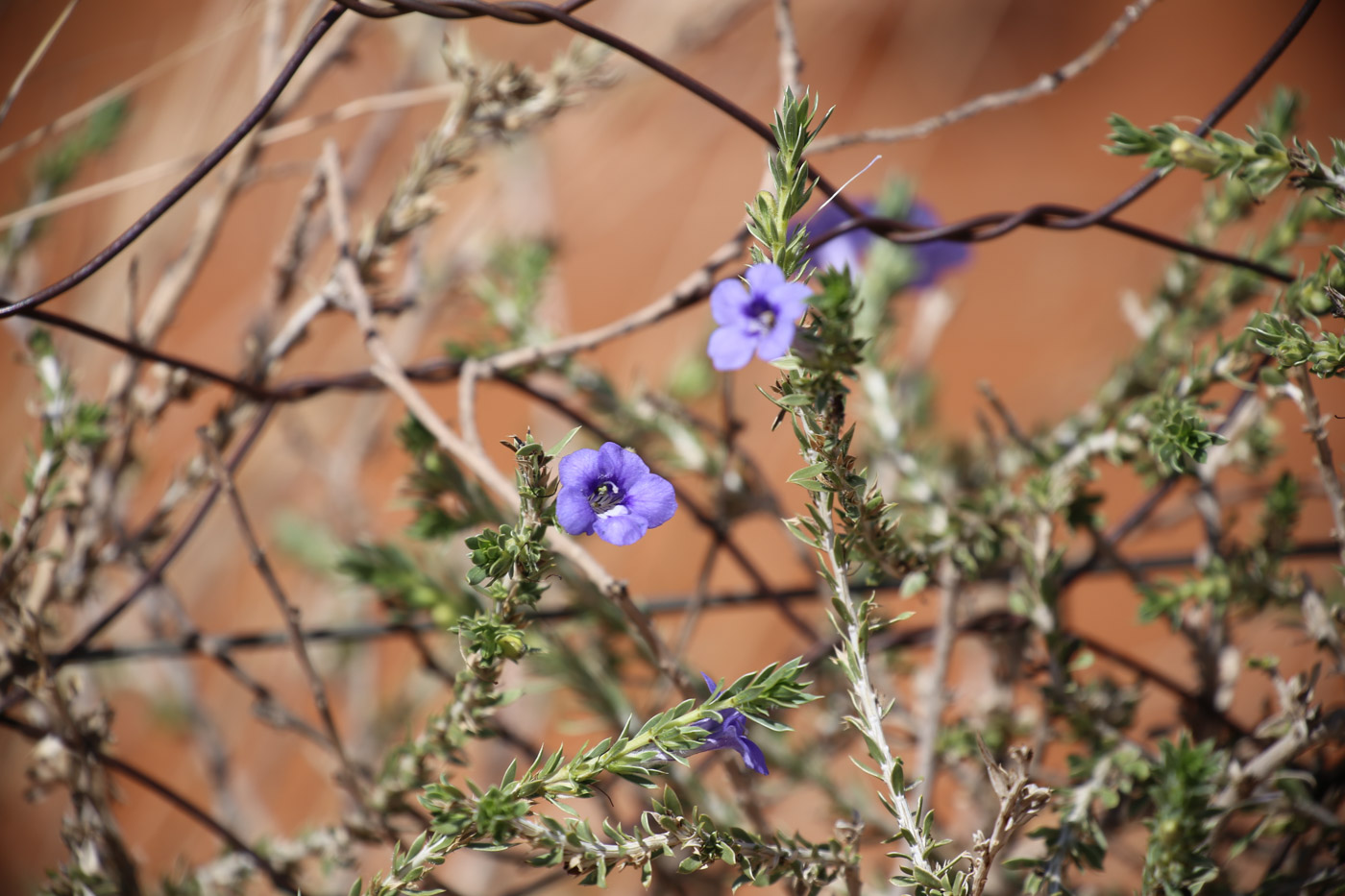

Scientific classification
- Kingdom: Plantae
- Clade: Tracheophytes
- Clade: Angiosperms
- Clade: Eudicots
- Clade: Asterids
- Order: Lamiales
- Family: Scrophulariaceae
- Genus: Aptosimum
- Species: A. albomarginatum

Binomial name
- Aptosimum albomarginatum Marloth & Engl.

= Aptosimum albomarginatum =

Species of plant

Aptosimum albomarginatum is a species of flowering plant in the family Scrophulariaceae.
