= Aptosimum glandulosum =

Scientific classification
- Kingdom: Plantae
- Clade: Tracheophytes
- Clade: Angiosperms
- Clade: Eudicots
- Clade: Asterids
- Order: Lamiales
- Family: Scrophulariaceae
- Genus: Aptosimum
- Species: A. glandulosum

Binomial name
- Aptosimum glandulosum E. Web. & Schinz ex E. Web.

Synonyms
- Aptosimum feddeanum Pilg.

Species of plant

Aptosimum glandulosum is a species of flowering plant in the Scrophulariaceae family, native to Africa, specifically within the genus Aptosimum.
