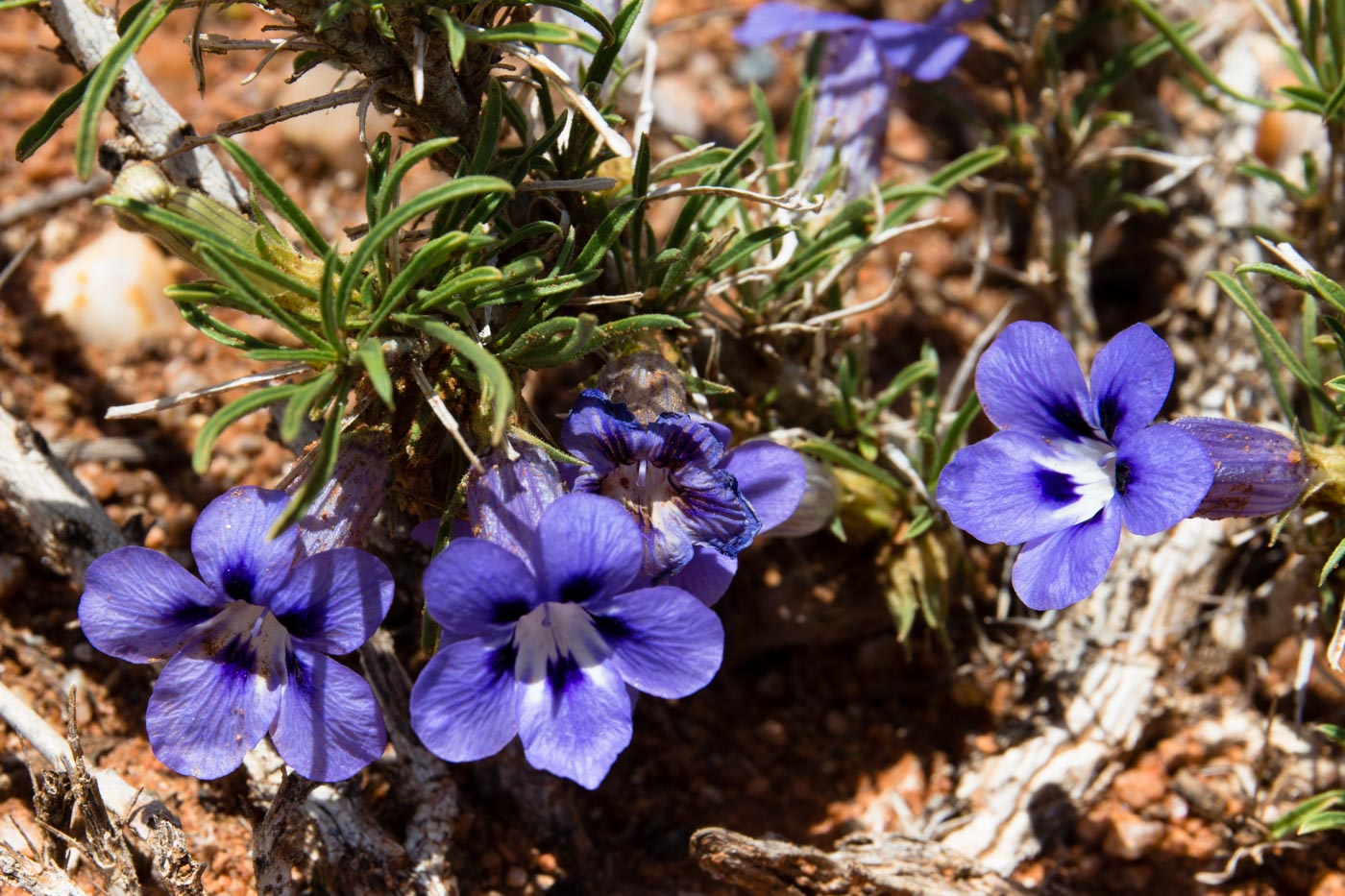

Scientific classification
- Kingdom: Plantae
- Clade: Tracheophytes
- Clade: Angiosperms
- Clade: Eudicots
- Clade: Asterids
- Order: Lamiales
- Family: Scrophulariaceae
- Genus: Aptosimum
- Species: A. spinescens

Binomial name
- Aptosimum spinescens Weber, 1907

Synonyms
- Aptosimum steingroeveri glabrum F. E. Weber & Schinz; Aptosimum steingroeveri Engl. Aptosimum scaberrimum tenuifolium F. E. Weber; Aptosimum scaberrimum Schinz; Aptosimum laricinum spinosior Dinter; Aptosimum laricinum Dinter; Aptosimum abietinum Burch.

= Aptosimum spinescens =

Species of plant

Aptosimum spinescens is a species of plant belonging to the genus Aptosimum. It was first described by Emil Weber in 1907.
