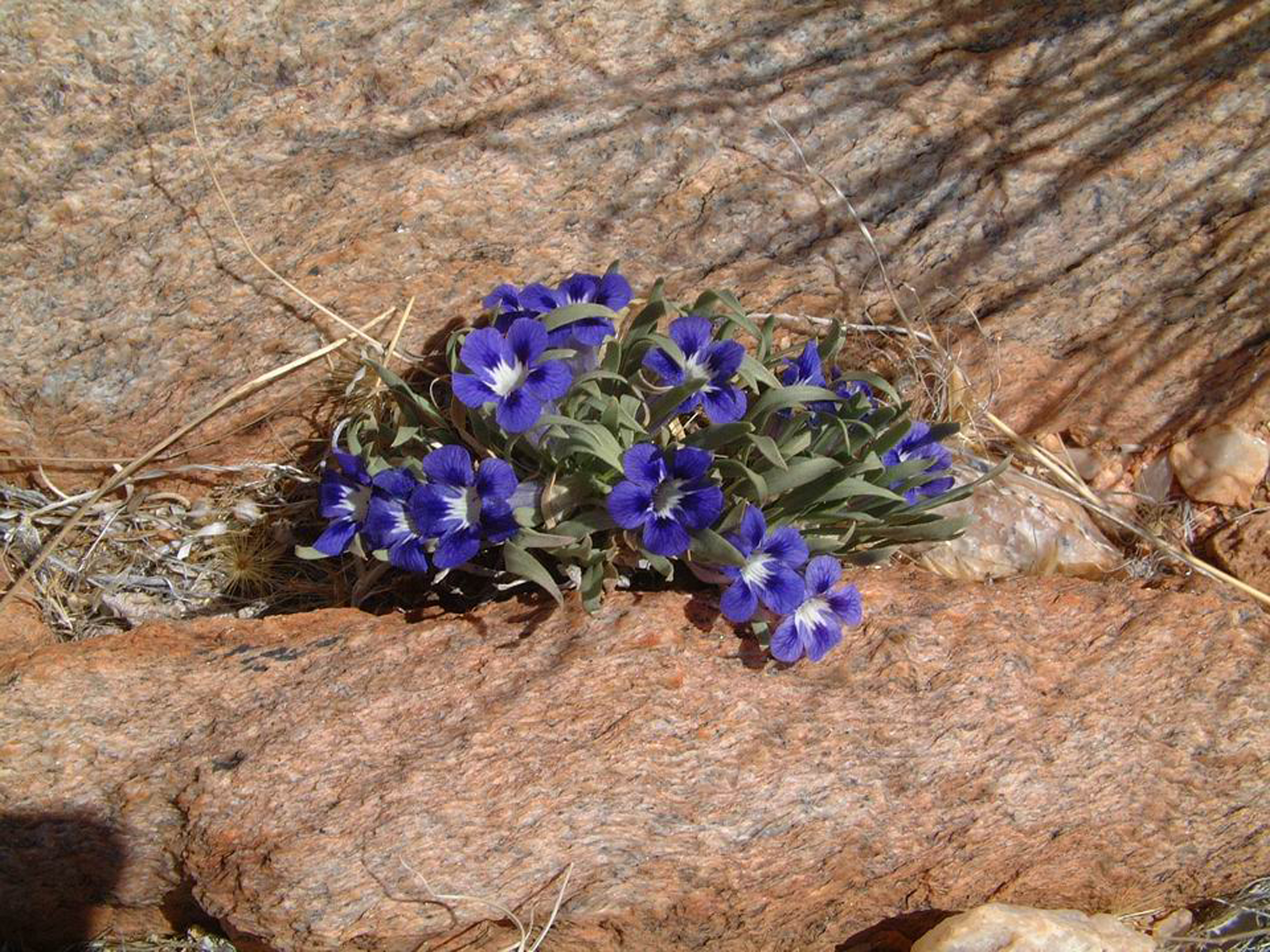
- Aptosimum indivisum

Scientific classification
- Kingdom: Plantae
- Clade: Embryophytes
- Clade: Tracheophytes
- Clade: Spermatophytes
- Clade: Angiosperms
- Clade: Eudicots
- Clade: Asterids
- Order: Lamiales
- Family: Scrophulariaceae
- Genus: Aptosimum; Burch. ex Benth.

Synonyms
- Chilostigma Hochst.; Ohlendorffia Lehm.

= Aptosimum =

Genus of flowering plants

Aptosimum is a genus of flowering plants in the family Scrophulariaceae. Species in this genus are native to dry tropical and southern Africa.

== Species ==
This genus includes the following species:

- Aptosimum albomarginatum Marloth & Engl.
- Aptosimum arenarium Engl.
- Aptosimum decumbens Schinz
- Aptosimum elongatum (Hiern) Engl.
- Aptosimum eriocephalum E.Mey. ex Benth.
- Aptosimum glandulosum Emil Weber & Schinz
- Aptosimum gossweileri Skan
- Aptosimum indivisum Burch. ex Benth.
- Aptosimum lineare Marloth & Engl.
- Aptosimum marlothii (Engl.) Hiern
- Aptosimum molle Skan
- Aptosimum neglectum Emil Weber
- Aptosimum patulum Bremek.
- Aptosimum procumbens (Lehm.) Burch. ex Steud.
- Aptosimum pumilum (Hochst.) Benth.
- Aptosimum radiatum Kolberg & van Slageren
- Aptosimum spinescens (Thunb.) Emil Weber
- Aptosimum suberosum Emil Weber
- Aptosimum tragacanthoides E.Mey. ex Benth.
- Aptosimum transvaalense Emil Weber
- Aptosimum viscosum Benth.
- Aptosimum welwitschii Hiern
