= Aptosimum patulum =

Scientific classification
- Kingdom: Plantae
- Clade: Tracheophytes
- Clade: Angiosperms
- Clade: Eudicots
- Clade: Asterids
- Order: Lamiales
- Family: Scrophulariaceae
- Genus: Aptosimum
- Species: A. patulum

Binomial name
- Aptosimum patulum Bremek.

Species of plant

Aptosimum patulum is a species of flowering plant in the Scrophulariaceae family, native to South Africa, particularly Limpopo province.
