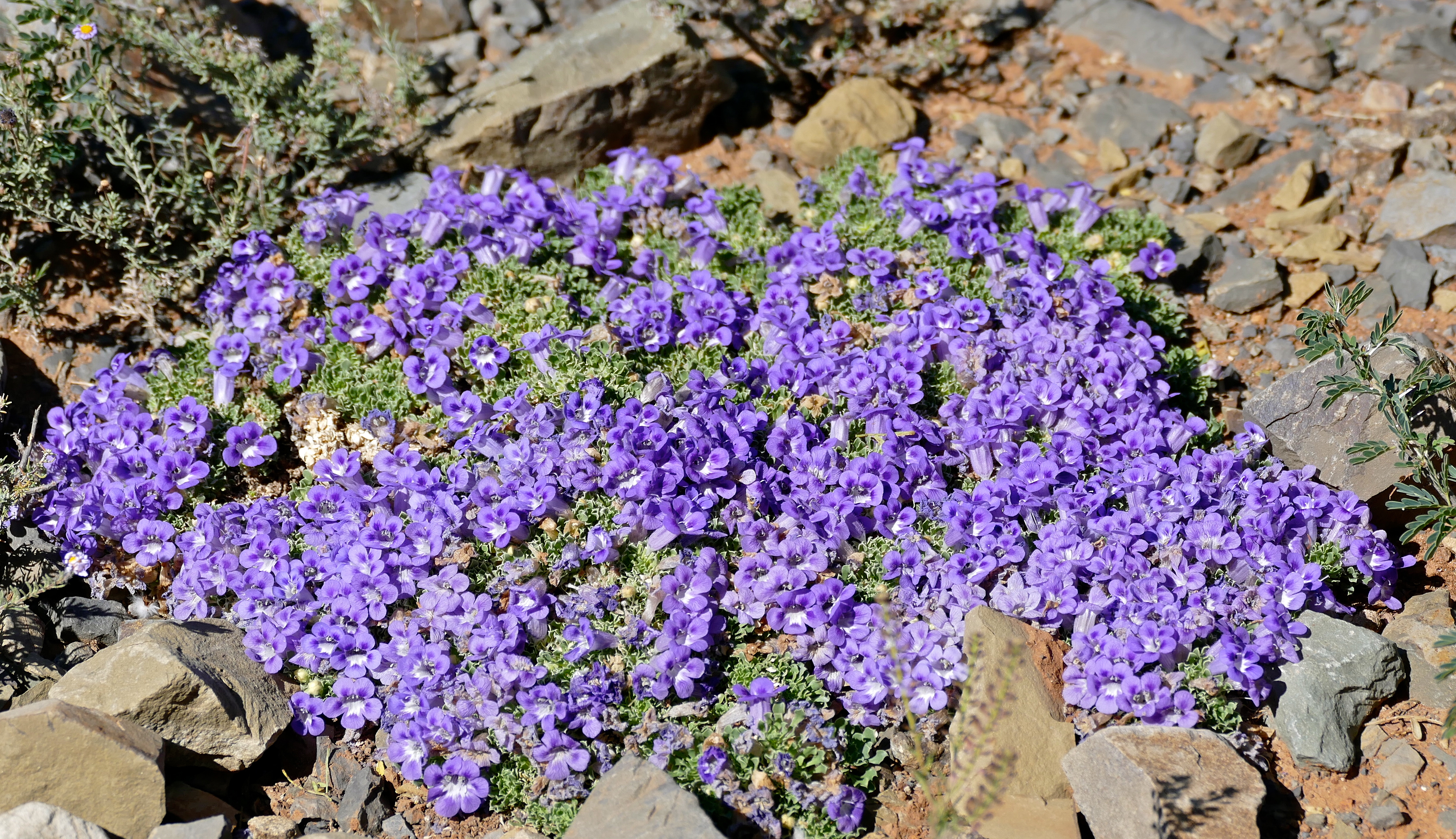

Scientific classification
- Kingdom: Plantae
- Clade: Tracheophytes
- Clade: Angiosperms
- Clade: Eudicots
- Clade: Asterids
- Order: Lamiales
- Family: Scrophulariaceae
- Genus: Aptosimum
- Species: A. procumbens

Binomial name
- Aptosimum procumbens (Lehm.) Burch. ex Steud.

Synonyms
- Ohlendorffia procumbens Lehm.; Calophanes depressus (L.f.) T.Anderson; Ruellia depressa L.f.; Russelia depressa Walp.; Aptosimum depressum Burch. ex Benth.; Aptosimum depressum var. benthamii Harv.

= Aptosimum procumbens =

Species of plant

Aptosimum procumbens, the Karoo violet, is a species of flowering plant belonging to the family Scrophulariaceae. It was first described by Johann Georg Christian Lehmann, and given the exact name by William John Burchell and Ernst Gottlieb von Steudel.
