= Rashba–Edelstein effect =

Spintronics-related effect

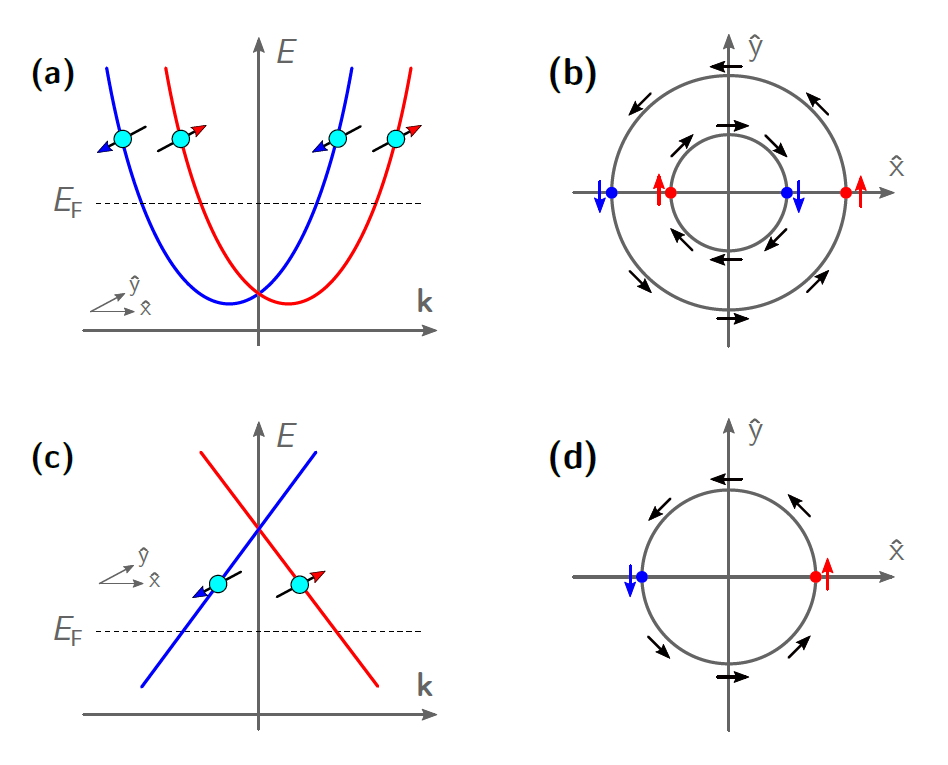
Rashba-split and topological insulator energy dispersion relations and Fermi contours: energy dispersion relation section (a) and Fermi contours (b) produced by the Rashba effect, and energy dispersion relation section (c) and Fermi contour (d) at the topological insulator surface.

The Rashba–Edelstein effect (REE) is a spintronic phenomenon in which a two-dimensional charge current generates a surface spin accumulation. This effect is an intrinsic charge-to-spin conversion mechanism and it was predicted in 1990 by scientist V. M. Edelstein. It was demonstrated in 2013 and confirmed by experimental evidence in the following years.

The origin of the effect can be ascribed to the presence of spin-polarized surface or interface states. Indeed, a structural inversion symmetry breaking (asymmetry) causes the Rashba effect to occur: this effect breaks the spin degeneracy of the energy bands and causes the spin polarization to be locked to the momentum in each branch of the dispersion relation. If a charge current flows in these spin-polarized surface states, it generates a spin accumulation. In the case of a bidimensional Rashba gas, where this band splitting occurs, this effect is called the Rashba–Edelstein effect.

For a class of peculiar materials called topological insulators, spin-split surface states exist independently from the Rashba effect, due to the surface topology. Topological insulators display a spin-split linear dispersion relation on their surfaces (i.e., spin-polarized Dirac cones), while having a band gap in the bulk (this is why these materials are called insulators). Also in this case, spin and momentum are locked, and, when a charge current flows in these spin-polarized surface states, a spin accumulation is produced; this is called the Edelstein effect. In both cases, a 2D charge-to-spin conversion mechanism occurs.

The reverse process is called the inverse Rashba–Edelstein effect, in which a spin accumulation is converted into a bidimensional charge current, resulting in a 2D spin-to-charge conversion.

The Rashba–Edelstein effect and its inverse effect are classified as spin-charge interconversion (SCI) mechanisms (another example is the spin Hall effect). Materials that display these effects are promising candidates for future technological applications such as spin injectors and detectors.

The Rashba–Edelstein effect is a surface effect, whereas the spin Hall effect is a bulk effect. Another difference between the two is that the Rashba–Edelstein effect is a purely intrinsic mechanism, while the spin Hall effect origin can be either intrinsic or extrinsic.

== Physical origin ==
The origin of the Rashba–Edelstein effect relies on the presence of spin-split surface or interface states, which can arise for a structural inversion asymmetry or because the material is a topological insulator (that is, it exhibits a topologically protected surface). In both cases, the material surface displays the spin polarization locked to the momentum, meaning that these two quantities are univocally linked and orthogonal one to the other (this is visible from the Fermi contours). It is worth noticing that a bulk inversion asymmetry can additionally be present, resulting in the Dresselhaus effect. In that case, the spin and momentum are still locked but their relative orientation is not straightforwardly determinable (since the orientation of the charge current with respect to the crystallographic axes is also relevant). In the following discussion, the Dresselhaus effect will be neglected for simplicity.

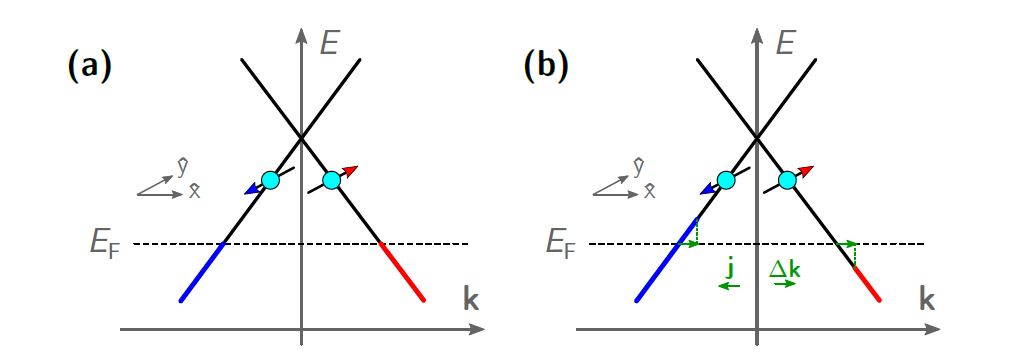
Topological insulator band structure in equilibrium (a) and in a non-equilibrium situation, when a spin-charge interconversion process occurs (b). Two possible effects could lead to the non-equilibrium situation: the injection of a charge current (i.e., a momentum unbalance), which is converted into a spin accumulation (Edelstein effect), or the injection of spins, resulting in a spin accumulation that produces a charge current (inverse Edelstein effect).

The topological insulator case is easier to visualize due to the presence of a single Fermi contour; therefore, this case is discussed first. Topological insulators display spin-split surface states where spin-momentum locking is present. Indeed, when a charge current flows in the surface states of the topological insulator, it can also be seen as a well-defined momentum shift $\Delta k$ in the reciprocal space, resulting in a different occupation of the spin-polarized branches of the Dirac cone. This imbalance, according to the structure of the topological insulator band dispersion relation, produces a spin accumulation in the investigated material, i.e., a charge-to-spin conversion occurs. The spin accumulation is orthogonal to the injected charge current, accordingly to spin-momentum locking. Due to the fact that these materials display a conductive behaviour on their surface while being insulating on their bulk, the charge current is only allowed to flow on the topological insulator surfaces: this is the origin of the bidimensionality of this charge-to-spin conversion mechanism.

In the Rashba–Edelstein effect, the spin-split dispersion relation consists in two bands displaced along the k-axis due to a structural inversion asymmetry, accordingly to the Rashba effect (i.e., these bands show a linear splitting in k due to the spin-orbit coupling). This results in two Fermi contours, which are concentric at equilibrium, both displaying spin-momentum locking but with opposite helicity. If the system is driven in an out-of-equilibrium condition by injecting a charge current, the two disks displace each other and a net spin accumulation arises. This effect occurs, for instance, in a bidimensional Rashba gas. Rashba splitting complicates the understanding and the visualization of the spin-to-charge conversion mechanism but the basic working principle of the Rashba–Edelstein effect is very similar to that of the Edelstein effect.

Experimentally speaking, the Rashba–Edelstein effect occurs if a charge current is electrically injected inside the topological insulator, for instance, by means of two electrodes where a potential difference is applied. The resulting spin accumulation can be probed in several ways, one of them is by employing the magneto optical Kerr effect (MOKE).

== Inverse Rashba–Edelstein effect ==
The reverse process, i.e., the inverse Rashba–Edelstein effect (I(R)EE) occurs when a spin accumulation is generated inside the investigated material and a consequent charge current arises on the material surface (in this case, being a 2D spin-to-charge conversion). In order to have the inverse Rashba–Edelstein effect, a spin accumulation is required to be generated inside the analyzed material, and this spin injection is usually achieved by coupling the investigated material with a ferromagnet in order to perform spin pumping or with a semiconductor where it is possible to perform optical orientation. As for the direct effect, the inverse Rashba–Edelstein effect occurs in materials lacking the structural inversion symmetry, while in topological insulators the inverse Edelstein effect arises.

In the case of the inverse Edelstein effect, the spin-to-charge conversion can be visualized by looking at the section of the Dirac cone, as follows. The spin injection produces a "piling up" of spins of one character in one of the energy dispersion relation branches. This results in a spin imbalance due to the different branch occupations (i.e., a spin accumulation), which leads to a momentum unbalance and, therefore, to a charge current that can be electrically detected. In both the direct and inverse Edelstein effects, this charge current can flow only on the topological insulator's surface due to the energy band conformation. This is how the 2D spin-to-charge conversion occurs in these materials; this could allow topological insulators to be exploited as spin detectors.

As for the direct effect, this analysis has been carried out for the inverse Edelstein effect because in this case only two energy branches are present. Analysis of the inverse Rashba–Edelstein effect is similar despite the presence of four energy branches, with spin-momentum locking, in the dispersion relation, and two consequent Fermi contours with opposite helicity. In this case, when a spin accumulation is generated inside the material, the two Fermi contours will be displaced from each other and thus generate a charge current, unlike the equilibrium case in which the two Fermi contours are concentric and no net momentum unbalance nor spin accumulation are present.

== Process efficiency ==
Both the direct and inverse Rashba–Edelstein effect rely on a spin accumulation. However, the figure of merit in the processes is commonly computed by accounting for the spin current density related to the spin accumulation, instead of the spin accumulation itself. This is analogous to the spin Hall angle for the spin Hall effect. Indeed, the efficiency of the direct and inverse Rashba–Edelstein effects can be estimated by means of the Rashba–Edelstein length: the ratio between the surface charge current density (flowing on the surface of the investigated material), and the three-dimensional spin current density (since the spin accumulation can diffuse in the three-dimensional space).

In the Rashba–Edelstein effect the spin current is a consequence of the spin accumulation that occurs in the material as the charge current flows on its surface (under the influence of a potential difference and, therefore, of an electric field), while in the inverse Rashba–Edelstein effect the spin current is the quantity injected inside the material leading to a spin accumulation and resulting in a charge flow localized at the material surface. In both cases, the asymmetry in the charge and spin current dimensions results in a dimensional ratio with units of length—this is the origin of the name of this efficiency parameter.

Analytically, the value of the bidimensional charge current density can be computed by employing the Boltzmann equation and considering the action of an electric field $\mathbf{E}$, resulting in:

$$\mathbf{j} = -\frac{q^2 \tau_{\rm m} k_{\rm F} v_{\rm F}}{4 \pi^2 \hbar}\mathbf{E}$$,

where $q$ is the elementary charge, $\tau_{\rm m}$ is the momentum scattering time, $k_{\rm F}$ and $v_{\rm F}$ are respectively the Fermi wavevector and the Fermi velocity, and $\hbar$ is the reduced Planck constant. The spin current density can also be analytically computed by integrating across the Fermi surface the product of the spin polarization and the corresponding distribution function. In the Edelstein effect case, this quantity results in:

$$\mathbf{j_{s}} = -\frac{q^2 k_{\rm F}}{4 \pi^2 \hbar}\mathbf{E}\times\mathbf{n}$$,

where $\mathbf{n}$ is the unit vector perpendicular to the surface on which the charge current flows (normal vector). From these formula can be observed the orthogonality of the spin and the charge current densities.

For the direct and inverse Edelstein effects, the conversion efficiency is:

$\lambda_{\rm EE} = \frac{j}{j_{s}} = \tau_{\rm m} v_{\rm F}$.

This parameter is conventionally positive for a Fermi contour with a counterclockwise helicity. The Rashba–Edelstein length derivation is the same as the Edelstein one, except for $v_{\rm F}$, which is substituted by the Rashba parameter $\alpha_{\rm R}$ (that is, $v_{\rm F} \to \frac{\alpha_{\rm R}}{\hbar}$), resulting in:

$$\lambda_{\rm REE} = \frac{j}{j_{s}} = \frac{\tau_{\rm m} \alpha_{\rm R}}{\hbar}$$.

The Rashba–Edelstein length of a material can be compared to other spin-charge interconversion efficiencies, such as the spin Hall angle, to establish if the material is an efficient spin-charge interconverter and therefore its suitability for spintronic applications. The Rashba–Edelstein length (2D spin-charge interconversion efficiency) can be effectively compared to the spin Hall angle (3D spin-charge interconversion efficiency), by dividing the $\lambda_{\rm REE}$ parameter for the thickness of the spin-split surface states in which this 2D conversion occurs. This "equivalent" spin Hall angle for the Rashba–Edelstein effect often results in being close to unity or even greater than unity: the Rashba–Edelstein effect is, on average, a more efficient spin-charge interconversion mechanism than the spin Hall effect; this could lead to future employment in technological industries of materials displaying this effect.

== See also ==
- Spin Hall effect
- Topological insulator
- Rashba effect
- Dresselhaus effect
- Spintronics
