= Electric dipole spin resonance =

Electric dipole spin resonance (EDSR) is a method to control the magnetic moments inside a material using quantum mechanical effects like the spin–orbit interaction. Mainly, EDSR allows to flip the orientation of the magnetic moments through the use of electromagnetic radiation at resonant frequencies. EDSR was first proposed by Emmanuel Rashba.

Computer hardware employs the electron charge in transistors to process information and the electron magnetic moment or spin for magnetic storage devices. The emergent field of spintronics aims in unifying the operations of these subsystems. For achieving this goal, the electron spin should be operated by electric fields. EDSR allows to use the electric component of AC fields to manipulate both charge and spin.

== Introduction ==
Free electrons possess electric charge $e$ and magnetic moment $\boldsymbol{\mu}$ whose absolute value is about one Bohr magneton $\mu_{\rm B}$.

The standard electron spin resonance, also known as electron paramagnetic resonance (EPR), is due to the coupling of electron magnetic moment to the external magnetic field $\mathbf{B}$ through the Hamiltonian $H=-\boldsymbol{\mu}\cdot\boldsymbol{B}$ describing its Larmor precession. The magnetic moment is related to electron angular momentum $\mathbf{S}$ as $\boldsymbol{\mu}=-g{\mu_{\rm B}}\mathbf{S}/\hbar$, where $g$ is the g-factor and $\hbar$ is the reduced Planck constant. For a free electron in vacuum $g\approx2$. As the electron is a spin-1/2 particle, the spin operator can take only two values: $\mathbf{S}=\pm\hbar/2$. So, Larmor interaction has quantized energy levels in a time-independent magnetic field as the energy is equal to $\pm\tfrac{1}{2}g\mu_{\rm B}B$. In the same way, under a resonant AC magnetic field $\tilde{\mathbf{B}}(t)$ at the frequency $\omega_S=g\mu_{\rm B}B/\hbar$, results in electron paramagnetic resonance, that is, the signal gets absorbed strongly at this frequency as it produces transitions between spin values.

=== Coupling electron spin to electric fields in atoms ===
In atoms, electron orbital and spin dynamics are coupled to the electric field of the protons in the atomic nucleus according to the Dirac equation. An electron moving in a static electric field $\boldsymbol{E}$ sees, according to the Lorentz transformations of special relativity, a complementary magnetic field $B\approx(v/c) E$ in the electron frame of reference. However, for slow electrons with $v/c\ll1$ this field is weak and the effect is small. This coupling is known as the spin–orbit interaction and gives corrections to the atomic energies about the order of the fine-structure constant squared $\alpha^2$, where $\alpha=e^2/\hbar c\approx1/137$ . However, this constant appears in combination with the atomic number $Z$ as $Z\alpha$, and this product is larger for massive atoms, already of the order of unity in the middle of the periodic table. This enhancement of the coupling between the orbital and spin dynamics in massive atoms originates from the strong attraction to the nucleus and the large electron speeds. While this mechanism is also expected to couple electron spin to the electric component of electromagnetic fields, such an effect has been probably never observed in atomic spectroscopy.

=== Basic mechanisms in crystals ===
Most important, spin–orbit interaction in atoms translates into spin–orbit coupling in crystals. It becomes an essential part of the band structure of their energy spectrum. The ratio of the spin–orbit splitting of the bands to the forbidden gap becomes a parameter that evaluates the effect of spin–orbit coupling, and it is generically enhanced, of the order of unity, for materials with heavy ions or with specific asymmetries.

As a result, even slow electrons in solids experience strong spin–orbit coupling. This means that the Hamiltonian of an electron in a crystal includes a coupling between the electron crystal momentum $\mathbf{k}=\mathbf{p}/\hbar$ and the electron spin. The coupling to the external electric field can be found by substituting the momentum in the kinetic energy as $\mathbf{k}\rightarrow\mathbf{k}-(e/\hbar c)\mathbf{A}$, where $\mathbf{A}$ is the magnetic vector potential, as it is required by the gauge invariance of electromagnetism. The substitution is known as Peierls substitution. Thus, the electric field $\mathbf{E}=-\frac{1}{c}\partial\mathbf{A}/\partial t$ becomes coupled to the electron spin and its manipulation may produce transitions between spin values.

== Theory ==
Electric dipole spin resonance is the electron spin resonance driven by a resonant AC electric field ${\tilde\mathbf{E}}$. Because the Compton length $\lambda_{\rm C}=\hbar/mc\approx4\times10^{-11} \mathrm{cm}$, entering into the Bohr magneton $\mu_{\rm B}=e\lambda_{\rm C}/2$ and controlling the coupling of electron spin to AC magnetic field ${\tilde\mathbf{B}}$, is much shorter than all characteristic lengths of solid state physics, EDSR can be by orders of magnitude stronger than ESR driven by an AC magnetic field. EDSR is usually strongest in materials without the inversion center where the two-fold degeneracy of the energy spectrum is lifted and time-symmetric Hamiltonians include products of the spin related Pauli matrices $\boldsymbol{\sigma}$, as $\mathbf{S}=(\hbar/2)\mathbf{\sigma}$, and odd powers of the crystal momentum $\mathbf{k}$. In such cases electron spin is coupled to the vector-potential ${\tilde\mathbf{A}}$ of electromagnetic field. Remarkably, EDSR on free electrons can be observed not only at the spin-resonance frequency $\omega_S$ but also at its linear combinations with the cyclotron resonance frequency $\omega_C$. In narrow-gap semiconductors with inversion center EDSR can emerge due direct coupling of electric field ${\tilde\mathbf{E}}$ to the anomalous coordinate $\mathbf{r}_{\rm SO}$.

EDSR is allowed both with free carriers and with electrons bound at defects. However, for transitions between Kramers conjugate bound states, its intensity is suppressed by a factor $\hbar\omega_S/\Delta E$ where $\Delta E$ is the separation between adjacent levels of the orbital motion.

=== Simplified theory and physical mechanism ===
As stated above, various mechanisms of EDSR operate in different crystals. The mechanism of its generically high efficiency is illustrated below as applied to electrons in direct-gap semiconductors of the InSb type. If spin–orbit splitting of energy levels $\Delta_{\rm so}$ is comparable to the forbidden gap $E_{\rm G}$, the effective mass of an electron $m^*$ and its g-factor can be evaluated in the framework of the Kane scheme, see k·p perturbation theory.

$$m^*\approx\frac{\hbar^2E_{\rm G}}{P^2},\,\,\,|g|\approx\frac{m_0P^2}{\hbar^2E_{\rm G}}$$,

where $P\approx 10 \text{ eV}\AA$ is a coupling parameter between the electron an valence bands, and $m_0$ is the electron mass in vacuum.

Choosing the spin–orbit coupling mechanism based on the anomalous coordinate ${\boldsymbol{r}_{\rm so}}$ under the condition :$\Delta_{\rm so}\approx E_G$, we have

$$r_{\rm so}\approx\frac{\hbar^2|g|k}{m_0E_{\rm G}}$$,

where $k$ is electron crystal momentum. Then energy of an electron in a AC electric field ${\tilde E}$ is

$$U=e\;r_{\rm so}{\tilde E}\approx e{\tilde E}\frac{P^2}{E_{\rm G}^2}k\approx e{\tilde E}\frac{\hbar^2k}{m^*E_{\rm G}}.$$

An electron moving in vacuum with a velocity $\hbar k/m_0$ in an AC electric field ${\tilde E}$ sees, according to the Lorentz transformation an effective magnetic field ${\tilde B}={v/c}{\tilde E}$. Its energy in this field

$$U_v=\mu_{\rm B}{\tilde B}=e{\tilde E}\frac{\hbar^2k}{m_0^2c^2},$$

The ratio of these energies

$$\frac{U}{U_v}\approx\frac{m_0}{m^*}\frac{m_0c^2}{E_{\rm G}}$$.

This expression shows explicitly where the dominance of EDSR over the electron paramagnetic resonance comes from. The numerator $m_0c^2\approx0.5\mathrm{MeV}$ of the second factor is a half of the Dirac gap while $E_{\rm G}$ is of atomic scale, $E_{\rm G}\approx$1eV. The physical mechanism behind the enhancement is based on the fact that inside crystals electrons move in strong field of nuclei, and in the middle of the periodic table the product $Z\;\alpha$ of the atomic number $Z$ and the fine-structure constant $\alpha$ is of the order of unity, and it is this product that plays the role of the effective coupling constant, cf. spin–orbit coupling. However, one should bear in mind that the above arguments based on effective mass approximation are not applicable to electrons localized in deep centers of the atomic scale. For them the EPR is usually the dominant mechanism.

== Inhomogeneous Zeeman coupling mechanism ==
Above mechanisms of spin–orbit coupling in solids originated from the Thomas interaction and couple spin matrices $\boldsymbol{\sigma}$ to electronic momentum ${\bf k}$. However, the Zeeman interaction

$$H_{\rm Z}({\bf r})=-\boldsymbol{\mu}\cdot \mathbf{B}(\mathbf{r})$$

in an inhomogeneous magnetic field $\mathbf{B}(\mathbf{r})$ produces a different mechanism of spin–orbit interaction through coupling the Pauli matrices $\boldsymbol{\sigma }$ to the electron coordinate $\bf r$. The magnetic field can be both a macroscopic inhomogeneous field or a microscopic fast-oscillating field inside ferro- or antiferromagnets changing at the scale of a lattice constant.

== Experiment ==
EDSR was first observed experimentally with free carriers in indium antimonide (InSb), a semiconductor with strong spin–orbit coupling. Observations made under different experimental conditions allowed demonstrate and investigate various mechanisms of EDSR. In a dirty material, Bell observed a motionally narrowed EDSR line at $\omega_S$ frequency against a background of a wide cyclotron resonance band. MacCombe et al. working with high quality InSb observed isotropic EDSR driven by the $(\mathbf{r}_{\rm so}\cdot{\tilde{\mathbf{E}}})$ mechanism at the combinational frequency $\omega_{\rm C}+\omega_S$ where $\omega_{\rm C}$ is the cyclotron frequency. Strongly anisotropic EDSR band due to inversion-asymmetry $k^3$ Dresselhaus spin–orbit coupling was observed in InSb at the spin-flip frequency $\omega_S$ by Dobrowolska et al. spin–orbit coupling in n-Ge that manifests itself through strongly anisotropic electron g-factor results in EDSR through breaking translational symmetry by inhomogeneous electric fields which mixes wave functions of different valleys. Infrared EDSR observed in semimagnetic semiconductor Cd$_{1-x}$Mn$_x$Se was ascribed to spin–orbit coupling through inhomogeneous exchange field. EDSR with free and trapped charge carriers was observed and studied at a large variety of three-dimensional (3D) systems including dislocations in Si, an element with notoriously weak spin–orbit coupling. All above experiments were performed in the bulk of three-dimensional (3D) systems.

== Applications ==
Principal applications of EDSR are expected in quantum computing and semiconductor spintronics, currently focused on low-dimensional systems. One of its main goals is fast manipulation of individual electron spins at a nanometer scale, e.g., in quantum dots of about 50 nm size. Such dots can serve as qubits of quantum computing circuits. Time-dependent magnetic fields practically cannot address individual electron spins at such a scale, but individual spins can be well addressed by time dependent electric fields produced by nanoscale gates. All basic mechanisms of EDSR listed above are operating in quantum dots, but in A$_3$B$_5$ compounds also the hyperfine coupling of electron spins to nuclear spins plays an essential role. For achieving fast qubits operated by EDSR are needed nanostructures with strong spin–orbit coupling. For the Rashba spin–orbit coupling

$$H_{\rm R}=\alpha_{\rm R}(\sigma_xk_y-\sigma_yk_x)$$,

the strength of interaction is characterized by the coefficient $\alpha_{\rm R}$. In InSb quantum wires the magnitude of $\alpha_{\rm R}$ of the atomic scale of about 1 eV$\AA$ has been already achieved. A different way for achieving fast spin qubits based on quantum dots operated by EDSR is using nanomagnets producing inhomogeneous magnetic fields.

== See also ==
- Fine electronic structure
- Stark effect
- Zeeman effect
- Electron electric dipole moment
