= Emmanuel Rashba =

Soviet-American theoretical physicist (1927–2025)

- Ukrainian: Еммануїл Йосипович Рашба; Russian: Эммануил Иосифович Рашба
- Born: October 30, 1927; Kyiv, Ukraine
- Died: January 12, 2025 (aged 97); Brookline, Massachusetts, U.S.
- Citizenship: United States
- Education: Taras Shevchenko National University of Kyiv, Physics Department
- Known for: Rashba effect EDSR; Giant oscillator strength Non-Euclidean surface growth
- Scientific career
- Fields: Condensed matter physics, spintronics, nanoscience
- Workplaces: Institute of Physics (Kyiv), Institute of Semiconductors (Kyiv), Landau Institute for Theoretical Physics (Moscow), University of Utah (Salt Lake City), University at Buffalo, SUNY Harvard University (Cambridge, Massachusetts)

Emmanuel I. Rashba (October 30, 1927 – January 12, 2025) was a Soviet-American theoretical physicist of Jewish origin who worked in Ukraine, Russia and in the United States. Rashba is known for his contributions to different areas of condensed matter physics and spintronics, especially the Rashba effect in spin physics, and also for the prediction of electric dipole spin resonance (EDSR), that was widely investigated and became a regular tool for operating electron spins in nanostructures, phase transitions in spin-orbit coupled systems driven by change of the Fermi surface topology, Giant oscillator strength of impurity excitons, and coexistence of free and self-trapped excitons. The principal subject of spintronics is all-electric operation of electron spins, and EDSR was the first phenomenon predicted and experimentally observed in this field.

== Background ==
Born in Kyiv, Ukraine, Rashba survived the Nazi invasion during the Second World War by fleeing with his family to Kazan where he started studying physics at the Kazan University. His father Iosif (Joseph) Rashba was a prominent defence lawyer, a widely educated humanitarian, and his mother Rosalia was a teacher of English. After returning to Kyiv he graduated, with high honors, from the Physics Department of Kyiv University in 1949. His Instructors were Alexander Davydov, Solomon Pekar and Kirill Tolpygo.

Rashba died on January 12, 2025, at the age of 97.

== Career ==
Rashba's graduation from the university fell onto the last years of Stalin's reign darkened by extreme national chauvinism. As a result, he had to change temporary jobs five times during the five following years. During this time he initiated, as applied to dams, theory of gravitational stresses in growing elastic bodies (non-Euclidean grows, in current terminology), and also developed theory of exciton-phonon coupling in molecular crystals. In 1954 Rashba was accepted to the Semiconductor Department of the Institute of Physics of the National Academy of Sciences of Ukraine where he initially worked on the theory of transistors but earned his PhD degree in 1956 on his work on exciton-phonon coupling (including prediction of coexistence of free and self-trapped excitons, discovered experimentally two decades later on, based on the concept of self-trapping barrier for excitons essential for current work on Sun energy conversion). When the Institute for Semiconductors of the same Academy was established in 1960, Rashba headed there the Department for Theory of Semiconductor Devices. He earned his Doctor of Sciences degree from the A.F. Ioffe Institute in Leningrad in 1963 for his work on spin-orbit coupling in semiconductors and exciton spectroscopy of molecular crystals (deducing energy spectra of excitons in pure crystals from optical spectra of mixed crystals, in collaboration with Vladimir Broude). In collaboration with Solomon Pekar, Rashba introduced a mechanism of spin-orbit interaction in magnetic media originating from the coupling of electron spin to microscopically inhomogeneous magnetic field of magnetic background.

In 1966, after the Institute of Theoretical Physics of the Academy of Sciences of USSR (currently the Landau Institute for Theoretical Physics) was established in Chernogolovka (Moscow district), Rashba moved there and served as the head of the Theory of Semiconductors Division and afterwards as a principal scientist until 1997. During 1967-1991, Rashba also served as a professor of physics at the Moscow Institute of Physics and Technology (MIPT).

In 1991 Rashba moved to the United States, where he worked as a research scholar at the University of Utah (1992–1999), SUNY at Buffalo (2001–2004), and Harvard University (2004–2015). He was also associated with Massachusetts Institute of Technology (MIT, 2000–2004), served as an adjunct professor at Dartmouth College (2000–2003) and as a Rutherford Professor at the Loughborough University (2007–2010). During this period Rashba worked mostly on spintronics and physics of nanosystems. After Rashba's severe case of Guillain–Barré syndrome (1997) his ability to work was facilitated by his wife Erna and the family of his daughter.

For about 15 years Rashba served as a member of the editorial boards of the journals JETP Letters and Journal of Luminescence.

== Recognitions ==
Rashba was a Fellow of the American Physical Society. Among his recognitions are 1966 National Prize of the USSR and the International Conference on Luminescence ICL'99 Prize for his work on optical spectroscopy, Ioffe (1987, USSR), Pekar (2007, Ukraine), Doctor of Honoris Causa of Bogolyubov Institute for Theoretical Physics (2022, Ukraine), and Oliver E. Buckley (2022, US) Prizes for his work on spin-related phenomena, and 2005 Nevill Mott (UK) and 2005 Arkady Aronov (Israel) Lectureships.

Rashba's name became a part of a number of technical terms such as Rashba Hamiltonian, giant Rashba systems, Rashba physics, etc., which are parts of the titles of about 4000 scientific papers. According to Google Scholar, paper Ref. is the most cited and Ref. is the second most cited of the papers published in these journals, respectively.

== See also ==
- Nanotechnology
- Dresselhaus effect
