= Rashba =

Rashba may refer to:

- Shlomo ibn Aderet (1235–1310), medieval Jewish rabbi
- Emmanuel Rashba (1927–2025), Soviet-American theoretical physicist
  - Rashba effect, a spin-orbit coupling mechanism named after Emmanuel Rashba

== See also ==
- Rashbam
