= Dresselhaus effect =

Phenomenon in solid-state physics

The Dresselhaus effect is a phenomenon in solid-state physics in which spin–orbit interaction causes energy bands to split. It is usually present in crystal systems lacking inversion symmetry. The effect is named after Gene Dresselhaus, who discovered this splitting in 1955.

Spin–orbit interaction is a relativistic coupling between the electric field produced by an ion-core and the resulting dipole moment arising from the relative motion of the electron, and its intrinsic magnetic dipole proportional to the electron spin. In an atom, the coupling weakly splits an orbital energy state into two states: one state with the spin aligned to the orbital field and one anti-aligned. In a solid crystalline material, the motion of the conduction electrons in the lattice can be altered by a complementary effect due to the coupling between the potential of the lattice and the electron spin. If the crystalline material is not centro-symmetric, the asymmetry in the potential can favour one spin orientation over the opposite and split the energy bands into spin aligned and anti-aligned subbands.

The Rashba spin–orbit coupling has a similar energy band splitting, but the asymmetry comes either from the bulk asymmetry of uniaxial crystals (e.g. of wurtzite type) or the spatial inhomogeneity of an interface or surface. Dresselhaus and Rashba effects are often of similar strength in the band splitting of GaAs nanostructures.

== Zincblende Hamiltonian ==
Materials with zincblende structure are non-centrosymmetric (i.e., they lack inversion symmetry). This bulk inversion asymmetry (BIA) forces the perturbative Hamiltonian to contain only odd powers of the linear momentum. The bulk Dresselhaus Hamiltonian or BIA term is usually written in this form:

$$H_{\rm D}\propto p_x(p_y^2-p_z^2)\sigma_x + p_y(p_z^2-p_x^2)\sigma_y+p_z(p_x^2-p_y^2)\sigma_z,$$

where $\sigma_x$, $\sigma_y$ and $\sigma_z$ are the Pauli matrices related to the spin $\mathbf{S}$ of the electrons as $\mathbf{S}=\tfrac{1}{2}\hbar\sigma$ (here $\hbar$ is the reduced Planck constant), and $p_x$, $p_y$ and $p_z$ are the components of the momentum in the crystallographic directions [100], [010] and [001], respectively.

When treating 2D nanostructures where the width direction $z$ or [001] is finite, the Dresselhaus Hamiltonian can be separated into a linear and a cubic term. The linear Dresselhaus Hamiltonian $H_{\rm D}^{(1)}$ is usually written as

$$H_{\rm D}^{(1)}=\frac{\beta}{\hbar}(\sigma_xp_x-\sigma_yp_y),$$

where $\beta$ is a coupling constant.

The cubic Dresselhaus term $H_{\rm D}^{(3)}$ is written as

$$H_{\rm D}^{(3)}=-\frac{\beta}{\hbar^3}\left(\frac{d}{\pi}\right)^2 p_xp_y(p_y\sigma_x-p_x\sigma_y),$$

where $d$ is the width of the material.

The Hamiltonian is generally derived using a combination of the k·p perturbation theory alongside the Kane model.

== See also ==
- Fine electronic structure
- Electric dipole spin resonance
- Spin–orbit interaction
