= Joaquin Mazdak Luttinger =

American physicist (1923-1997)

- Joaquin Mazdak Luttinger
- Born: 2 December 1923; New York City, United States
- Died: 6 April 1997 (aged 73); New York City, US
- Education: Massachusetts Institute of Technology
- Known for: Luttinger liquid Luttinger's theorem Luttinger parameter Luttinger–Kohn model Luttinger–Ward functional Anomalous Hall effect Kohn–Luttinger superconductivity
- Awards: Guggenheim Fellowship (1974)
- Scientific career
- Fields: Physics of interacting particles
- Workplaces: University of Michigan, University of Pennsylvania, Columbia University
- Notable students: T. V. Ramakrishnan

Joaquin (Quin) Mazdak Luttinger (December 2, 1923 – April 6, 1997) was an American physicist well known for his contributions to the theory of interacting electrons in one-dimensional metals (the electrons in these metals are said to be in a Luttinger-liquid state) and the Fermi-liquid theory. He received his BS and PhD in physics from MIT in 1947. His brother was the physical chemist Lionel Luttinger (1920–2009) and his nephew is the mathematician Karl Murad Luttinger (born 1961).

== See also ==
- Negative mass
- Schrieffer–Wolff transformation
- Wiener sausage
- Fermi liquid
- Many-body problem
- Anomalous magnetic moment
- Effective mass theory
- k·p perturbation theory

== Some publications ==
(Note: For a complete list, see J. Stat. Phys. 103, 641 (2001).)

- W. Kohn, and J. M. Luttinger, Quantum Theory of Electrical Transport Phenomena, Physical Review, Vol. 108, pp. 590–611 (1957). APS
- W. Kohn, and J. M. Luttinger, Quantum Theory of Electrical Transport Phenomena. II, Physical Review, Vol. 109, pp. 1892–1909 (1958). APS
- J. M. Luttinger, Theory of the Hall Effect in Ferromagnetic Substances, Physical Review, Vol. 112, pp. 739–751 (1958). APS
- W. Kohn, and J. M. Luttinger, Ground-State Energy of a Many-Fermion System, Physical Review, Vol. 118, pp. 41–45 (1960). APS
- J. M. Luttinger, and J. C. Ward, Ground-State Energy of a Many-Fermion System. II, Physical Review, Vol. 118, pp. 1417–1427 (1960). APS
- J. M. Luttinger, Fermi Surface and Some Simple Equilibrium Properties of a System of Interacting Fermions, Physical Review, Vol. 119, pp. 1153–1163 (1960). APS
- J. M. Luttinger, Analytic Properties of Single-Particle Propagators for Many-Fermion Systems, Physical Review, Vol. 121, pp. 942–949 (1961). APS
- J. M. Luttinger, Theory of the de Hass-van Alphen Effect for a System of Interacting Fermions, Physical Review, Vol. 121, pp. 1251–1258 (1961). APS
- J. M. Luttinger, Derivation of the Landau Theory of Fermi Liquids. I. Formal Properties, Physical Review, Vol. 127, pp. 1423–1431 (1962). APS
- J. M. Luttinger, Derivation of the Landau Theory of Fermi Liquids. II. Equilibrium Properties and Transport Equation, Physical Review, Vol. 127, pp. 1431–1440 (1962). APS
- J. M. Luttinger, An exactly solvable model of a many-fermion system, Journal of Mathematical Physics, Vol. 4, No. 9, pp. 1154–1162 (1963). doi:10.1063/1.1704046
- W. Kohn, and J. M. Luttinger, New Mechanism for Superconductivity, Physical Review Letters, Vol. 15, No. 12, pp. 524–526 (1965). APS
- R. Friedberg, and J. M. Luttinger, Density of electronic energy levels in disordered systems, Physical Review B, Vol. 12, pp. 4460–4474 (1975). APS
- J. M. Luttinger, Density of electronic energy levels in disordered systems. II, Physical Review B, Vol. 13, pp. 2596–2600 (1976). APS
- R. Tao, and J. M. Luttinger, Exact evaluation of Green's functions for a class of one-dimensional disordered systems, Physical Review B, Vol. 27, pp. 935–944 (1983). APS

== Obituary ==
- Philip W. Anderson, Richard M. Friedberg, and Walter Kohn, Joaquin M. Luttinger, Physics Today, December 1997, pp. 89–90 (PDF).
  Note: This obituary is reprinted with permission in Journal of Statistical Physics, Vol. 103, Nos. 3/4, pp. 413–415 (2001) (Link).
