= Orbital Rashba effect =

Concept in condensed matter physics

The orbital Rashba effect refers to the emergence of finite orbital angular momentum (OAM) Bloch states at solid surfaces, driven by the confining electric field that breaks inversion symmetry. The formation of chiral OAM states is the primary energy-lowering mechanism of Rashba states. In turn, chiral spin angular momentum (SAM) arises from these preexisting chiral OAM structures through spin–orbit coupling, linking the orientations of the two angular momenta. Thus, the OAM structure plays the central role in Rashba phenomena, while the spin texture appears as a concomitant effect. The orbital Rashba effect has been observed on the surfaces of a wide range of materials, including Au, Bi, Sb, Al, and the topological insulator Bi_{2}Se_{3}.

== Theory ==
The formation of chiral OAM can be demonstrated with a tight-binding Hamiltonian of electrons with $p_x$, $p_y$, $p_z$ orbitals. In the presence of electric field perpendicular to the plane (assumed along the $z$-direction), hybridization between ($p_x$, $p_y$) orbitals and $p_z$ orbital can take place and the Bloch states can be constructed accordingly. The Bloch state $|{\bf k}\rangle$ carries an internal angular orientation given by the average of the orbital angular momentum ${\bf L}$, ${\bf L}_{\bf k} = \langle {\bf k} | {\bf L} |{\bf k}\rangle$. The electrostatic energy gain for the Bloch state can be expressed as

$$\Delta E_{\bf k} = \alpha_{\rm OR} \hat{z} \cdot ({\bf k} \times {\bf L}_{\bf k} )$$

in the vicinity of the $\Gamma$ (${\bf k} = {\bf 0}$) point. It is analogous to the Rashba Hamiltonian for spins, with the SAM replaced by OAM. The coefficient $\alpha_{\rm OR}$ is proportional to the work function, reflecting the electrostatic confinement at the surface. To minimize Coulomb energy, the angular momentum (including both spin and orbital parts) must be perpendicular both to ${\bf k}$ and the surface normal:

$${\bf L}_{\bf k} \propto \hat{z}\times {\bf k} .$$

In contrast to the conventional Rashba state showing spin polarization

$${\bf S}_{\bf k} \propto \hat{z} \times {\bf k} ~~ ({\bf S}_{\bf k} = \langle {\bf k} | {\bf S} |{\bf k} \rangle )$$

with spin operator ${\bf S}$, the orbital Rashba state develops chiral structure in momentum space for the orbital polarization.

The constant $\alpha_{\rm OR}$ is determined by the surface work function, independent of the atomic spin-orbit coupling. In the extreme case, even with no spin polarization, the energy can be lowered solely by orbital angular momentum. This means the orbital Rashba effect precedes the spin Rashba effect. The electric dipole moment of each Bloch state is proportional to ${\bf k} \times {\bf L}_{\bf k}$, which couples to the confining electric field at the surface. To lower the energy, the orientation of ${\bf L}_{\bf k}$ assumes the direction perpendicular to both the confining electric field $\hat{z}$ and the Bloch momentum ${\bf k}$, as confirmed in several tight-binding and first-principles calculations.

== Experimental confirmation of chiral OAM through circular dichroism ==
Experimental observation of chiral OAM in orbital Rashba states has been achieved using circular dichroism angle-resolved photoemission spectroscopy (CD-ARPES). This technique measures the difference in photoemission intensities obtained with left- and right-circularly polarized light. The CD-ARPES intensity was shown to be proportional to the OAM, providing a direct probe of orbital textures

The surface states of Bi_{2}Se_{3}, a prototypical topological insulator, have also been identified as orbital Rashba states. CD-ARPES measurements on Bi_{2}Se_{3} revealed dichroism patterns consistent with the expected chiral OAM structure. Similar experiments have been carried out on the surface states of Au(111), the best-known example of Rashba states. CD-ARPES experiments have also been performed in the bulk Rashba states of PtCoO_{2} and BiTeI, both of which lack inversion symmetry in their crystal structures. These Rashba states can also be well explained within the framework of the orbital Rashba effect. The observed CD-ARPES patterns display the OAM texture predicted by the orbital Rashba effect, demonstrating that orbital angular momentum is an intrinsic and ubiquitous feature of Rashba states. Furthermore, ARPES measurements combined with first-principles calculations have confirmed the presence of the orbital Rashba state in the binary honeycomb monolayer AgTe

== See also ==
- Rashba effect
