= John Clive Ward =

Anglo-Australian physicist (1924–2000)

- Born: 1 August 1924; London, England
- Died: 6 May 2000 (aged 75); Victoria, British Columbia, Canada
- Education: University of Oxford
- Known for: Ising model Quantum field theory Ward–Takahashi identity Luttinger–Ward functional Hydrogen bomb
- Awards: Guthrie Medal (1981); Dirac Medal (UNSW) (1981); Heineman Prize (1982); Hughes Medal (1983)
- Scientific career
- Fields: Particle physics Condensed-matter physics Statistical mechanics
- Workplaces: Institute for Advanced Study; Bell Laboratories; University of Adelaide; University of Maryland; University of Miami; Carnegie Institute of Technology; Johns Hopkins University; Victoria University of Wellington; Macquarie University
- Thesis: Some Properties of Elementary Particles (1949)
- Doctoral advisor: Maurice Pryce

John Clive Ward, FRS (1 August 1924 – 6 May 2000) was an Anglo-Australian physicist who made significant contributions to quantum field theory, condensed-matter physics, and statistical mechanics. Andrei Sakharov called Ward one of the titans of quantum electrodynamics.

Ward introduced the Ward–Takahashi identity. He was one of the authors of the Standard Model of gauge particle interactions: his contributions were published in a series of papers he co-authored with Abdus Salam. He is also credited with being an early advocate of the use of Feynman diagrams. It has been said that physicists have made use of his principles and developments "often without knowing it, and generally without quoting him." The Ising model was another one of his research interests.

In 1955, Ward was recruited to work at the Atomic Weapons Research Establishment at Aldermaston. There, he independently derived a version of the Teller–Ulam design, for which he has been called the "father of the British H-bomb".

== Early life ==
John Clive Ward was born in East Ham, London, on 1 August 1924. He was the son of Joseph William Ward, a civil servant who worked in Inland Revenue, and his wife Winifred née Palmer, a schoolteacher. He had a sister, Mary Patricia. He attended Chalkwell Elementary School and Westcliff High School for Boys. In 1938 he sat for and won a £100 scholarship to Bishop Stortford College. He took the Higher School Certificate Examination in 1942, receiving distinctions in Mathematics, Physics, Chemistry and Latin, and was offered a postmastership (scholarship) to Merton College, Oxford.

Although the Second World War was raging at the time, Ward was not called up by the Army, and was allowed to complete his Bachelor of Arts degree in Engineering Science with first class honours, studying mathematics under J. H. C. Whitehead and E. C. Titchmarsh. He received a bursary from the Harmsworth Trust, and in October 1946, with the war over, secured a position as a graduate assistant to Maurice Pryce, who had recently been appointed a professor of theoretical physics at Oxford.

== Scientific contributions ==
Ward's total number of published papers was only about 20, a fact that reflects a strong sense of self-criticism. He was also critical of what he called "PhD factories" and expressed scepticism towards the importance attached to having a large number of citations. He never supervised graduate students. He received some significant awards, including the Guthrie Medal and Dirac Medal of the University of New South Wales in 1981, the Heineman Prize in 1982, and the Hughes Medal in 1983 "for his highly influential and original contributions to quantum field theory, particularly the Ward identity and the Salam–Ward theory of weak interactions". He became a fellow of the Royal Society in 1965.

Andrei Sakharov said Ward was one of the "titans" of quantum electrodynamics alongside Freeman Dyson, Richard Feynman, Julian Schwinger, Sin-Itiro Tomonaga and Gian Carlo Wick. In this regard, it has been said that physicists have made use of his principles and developments "often without knowing it, and generally without quoting him."

=== Quantum entanglement ===
In 1947, Ward and Pryce published a paper in Nature, in which they were the first to calculate, and use, probability amplitudes for the polarisation of a pair of quantum entangled photons moving in opposite directions. For polarisations x and y, Ward derived this probability amplitude to be:

$$\left|\psi\right\rang=(\left|x,y\right\rang - \left|y,x\right\rang )$$

which can be normalised as:

$$\left|\psi\right\rang= {1 \over \sqrt{2}}(\left|x\right\rang_{1} \left|y\right\rang_{2}- \left|y\right\rang_{1} \left|x\right\rang_{2})$$

This can be used to derive the correlation of polarisation of the two photons. Their prediction was confirmed experimentally by Chien-Shiung Wu and I. Shaknov in 1950. This was the first experimental confirmation of a pair of entangled photons as applicable to the Einstein–Podolsky–Rosen (EPR) paradox. The result was subsequently explained by Richard Dalitz and Frank Duarte. Apparently following Dirac's doctrine, Ward was never bothered by issues of interpretation in quantum mechanics.

With his Harmsworth scholarship expiring, and seeing few prospects at Oxford, Ward responded to a job advertisement from the University of Sydney. He was offered a position, but when he arrived, found that it was for a tutor, and not a lecturer. He therefore served out the year, then returned to Oxford to complete his Doctor of Philosophy (D.Phil.) thesis on "Some Properties of the Elementary Particles". Ward expected that his thesis, an elaboration of his 1947 paper, would be easily approved by the external examiner, Nicholas Kemmer, but at the last minute Kemmer's place was taken by Rudolf Peierls, who refused to accept it. Only after a forceful argument by the internal examiner, J. de Witt, was the thesis awarded.

=== Ward identity ===
Pryce arranged for Ward to receive an award from the Department of Scientific and Industrial Research (DSIR) for two years. It was then that he developed the Ward–Takahashi identity, originally known as "Ward Identity" (or "Ward's Identities"). This result in quantum electrodynamics was inspired by a conjecture of Freeman Dyson, and was disclosed in a one-half-page letter typical of Ward's succinct style. In their book Quantum Electrodynamics, Walter Greiner and Joachim Reinhardt state in their discussion of charge renormalisation: "the Ward Identity has a much more fundamental significance: it ensures the universality of the electromagnetic interaction." In his book The Infinity Puzzle, Frank Close wrote: "Ward's Identities are the basic foundations on which the entire edifice of renormalisation rests."

In 1950, Ward's DSIR fellowship was coming to an end. Pryce had become a visiting professor at the Institute for Advanced Study in Princeton, New Jersey, and Ward's colleagues P. T. Matthews and Abdus Salam were visiting members there in the 1950–1951 academic year. Through them, he was able to secure a $3,000 membership for the 1951–1952 academic year. It was at Princeton that he was introduced to the Ising Model, and met Mark Kac from Cornell University, with whom he would collaborate on an exact solution of the Ising model using a combinatorial method. His joint work with Kac on the Ising Model gave rise to what is now being called the Kac-Ward operator. When his membership ended he worked for the Bell Laboratories in 1952 and 1953. He then accepted an offer of a lectureship at the University of Adelaide from Bert Green, where he worked for a year before taking up another membership at the Institute for Advanced Study.

=== Standard Model ===
Luttinger's theorem (introduced by J. M. Luttinger and Ward) relates a Fermi liquid's particle density to the volume enclosed by its Fermi surface.

Ward left the British hydrogen bomb programme and took a job with an electronics company in California. Later in 1956, Elliott Montroll offered him a visiting professorship at the University of Maryland. Noting a recent paper by Keith Brueckner and Murray Gell-Mann on the ground state energy of an electron gas, Ward gave a lecture in which he proposed a different approach. Montroll recognised that this was Debye–Hückel theory. Over the next few weeks, Ward later recalled, "We had managed not only to produce a definitive extension of a previously purely classical theory, but also to establish the rules for diagrammatic treatment of problems in quantum statistical mechanics, rules that are now the bread and butter of modern calculations."

Soon after, physicists were rocked by the news that Wu and Tsung-Dao Lee had demonstrated in the Wu experiment that parity is not conserved in weak interactions. This inspired Ward to consider particle physics again. Along with many others, he consider how gauge theory could be applied to Fermi's theory of beta decay. Ward became one of the authors of the Standard Model of gauge particle interactions; his contributions on electromagnetic and weak interactions were published in a series of papers he co-authored with Abdus Salam. Ward wrote a note to Abdus, informing him that Albert Einstein would be spinning in his grave, presumably clockwise.

The contributions of Salam and Ward to the Standard Model were used in the development of the theoretical structure of the Higgs boson. Ward also made contributions to quantum mechanics, fermion theory, quantum solid-state physics, and statistical mechanics and the Ising model.

== Aldermaston ==
In 1955, Ward was recruited by William Cook to work on the British hydrogen bomb programme at the Atomic Weapons Research Establishment at Aldermaston. The British government had decided that it needed hydrogen bombs, and it was Aldermaston's task to design one. Cook had been put in charge of the project in September 1954. Ward was the only theoretical physicist at Aldermaston; the director, William Penney, although a physicist, was an expert on hydrodynamics and instrumentation. Penney was not happy to have Ward forced on him, and the two did not get along. John Corner recalled that Ward did not fit in at Aldermaston.

British knowledge of thermonuclear designs was limited to the work done by the wartime Manhattan Project: Edward Teller's Classic Super, and a 1946 design by John von Neumann and Klaus Fuchs. All that was known for certain about the American hydrogen bomb design was that it had multiple stages. "I was assigned", Ward later recalled, "the improbable job of uncovering the secret of the Ulam–Teller invention ... an idea of genius far beyond the talents of the personnel at Aldermaston, a fact well-known to both Cook and Penney."

After working through a large number of proposals, Ward hit upon a workable design incorporating staging, compression and radiation implosion. At a meeting on 2 December 1955, Ward sketched it on the blackboard. Penny's response was cool, regarding it as too complicated, but Cook recognised it as worthy. Although Ward's design was not the one ultimately adopted for the hydrogen bombs used in Operation Grapple, the concept was influential, and the development of a more advanced design than the Americans had would be the key to achieving the overall objective of the project—a resumption of the nuclear Special Relationship with the Americans. He has been called the "father of the British H-bomb".

== Macquarie University ==
After Maryland, Ward looked for a new job. He thought he had found one at the University of Miami in Florida, but was denied tenure and left in 1959. He then secured a position at Carnegie Mellon University in Pittsburgh, Pennsylvania, but was unhappy there. He applied once again for a one-year membership at the Institute for Advanced Study, and was accepted for a third time. Theodore H. Berlin then offered him a position at Johns Hopkins University in 1961. He remained until 1966, when he answered an advertisement for a mathematics professor at Victoria University of Wellington in New Zealand. Australian friends were astounded that anyone would choose New Zealand over Australia. At Macquarie University in Sydney he was welcomed by Professor Peter Mason in 1968 with a professorial appointment. He turned down offers from Oxford and Cambridge. He eventually became an Australian citizen.

In 1967 he created the physics program at Macquarie University using the Feynman Lectures on Physics as primary textbooks. This program had a strong experimental emphasis and Ward himself (who originally was trained as an engineer) "had great admiration for anything practical". He is credited with being an early pioneer in the use of Feynman diagrams, and spreading their use in Australia. In the late 1970s Ward participated, with Frank Duarte, in the successful Macquarie science reform movement, and considered this a "most important accomplishment". The most visible sign was that the university agreed to present Bachelor of Science (BSc) degrees instead of just Bachelor of Arts (BA) degrees, the former being more highly prized by students and workplaces in Australia.

== Personal life and death ==
Besides his physics, Ward played the piano and the French horn. Ward played the piano at public performances, for example, in August 1968 playing Grieg at Blacktown Town Hall, Sydney. He was a bachelor for most of his life, but he was briefly married while in the US. He had no children. He died on Vancouver Island in British Columbia, Canada, on 6 May 2000, from a respiratory illness.
