= Giant oscillator strength =

Giant oscillator strength is inherent in excitons that are weakly bound to impurities or defects in crystals.

The spectrum of fundamental absorption of direct-gap semiconductors such as gallium arsenide (GaAs) and cadmium sulfide (CdS) is continuous and corresponds to band-to-band transitions. It begins with transitions at the center of the Brillouin zone, $\boldsymbol{k}=0$. In a perfect crystal, this spectrum is preceded by a hydrogen-like series of the transitions to s-states of Wannier-Mott excitons. In addition to the exciton lines, there are surprisingly strong additional absorption lines in the same spectral region. They belong to excitons weakly bound to impurities and defects and are termed 'impurity excitons'. Anomalously high intensity of the impurity-exciton lines indicate their giant oscillator strength of about $f_i\sim10$ per impurity center while the oscillator strength of free excitons is only of about $f_{\rm ex}\sim10^{-4}$ per unit cell. Shallow impurity-exciton states are working as antennas borrowing their giant oscillator strength from vast areas of the crystal around them. They were predicted by Emmanuel Rashba first for molecular excitons and afterwards for excitons in semiconductors. Giant oscillator strengths of impurity excitons endow them with ultra-short radiational life-times $\tau_i\sim1$ ns.

== Bound excitons in semiconductors: Theory ==
Interband optical transitions happen at the scale of the lattice constant which is small compared to the exciton radius. Therefore, for large excitons in direct-gap crystals the oscillator strength $f_{\rm ex}$ of exciton absorption is proportional to $|\Phi_{\rm ex}(0)|^2$ which is the value of the square of the wave function of the internal motion inside the exciton $\Phi_{\rm ex}(\boldsymbol{r}_e-\boldsymbol{r}_h)$ at coinciding values of the electron $\boldsymbol{r}_e$ and hole $\boldsymbol{r}_h$ coordinates. For large excitons $|\Phi_{\rm ex}(0)|^2\approx 1/a^3_{\rm ex}$ where $a_{\rm ex}$ is the exciton radius, hence, $f_{\rm ex}\approx v/a^3_{\rm ex}\ll1$, here $v$ is the unit cell volume. The oscillator strength $f_i$ for producing a bound exciton can be expressed through its wave function $\Psi_i(\boldsymbol{r}_e,\boldsymbol{r}_h)$ and $f_{\rm ex}$ as

$f_i=\frac{1}{v}\frac{(\int d\boldsymbol{r}_e\Psi_i(\boldsymbol{r}_e,\boldsymbol{r}_e))^2}{|\Phi_{\rm ex}(0)|^2}f_{\rm ex}$ .

Coinciding coordinates in the numerator, $\boldsymbol{r}_e=\boldsymbol{r}_h$, reflect the fact the exciton is created at a spatial scale small compared with its radius. The integral in the numerator can only be performed for specific models of impurity excitons. However, if the exciton is weakly bound to impurity, hence, the radius of the bound exciton $a_i$ satisfies the condition $a_i$ ≥ $a_{\rm ex}$ and its wave function of the internal motion $\Phi_{\rm ex}(\boldsymbol{r}_e-\boldsymbol{r}_h)$ is only slightly distorted, then the integral in the numerator can be evaluated as $(a_i/a_{\rm ex})^{3/2}$. This immediately results in an estimate for $f_i$

$f_i\approx\frac{a_i^3}{v}f_{\rm ex}$ .

This simple result reflects physics of the phenomenon of giant oscillator strength: coherent oscillation of electron polarization in the volume of about $a_i^3 >> v$.

If the exciton is bound to a defect by a weak short-range potential, a more accurate estimate holds

$f_i=8\left(\frac{\mu}{m}\frac{E_{\rm ex}}{E_i}\right)^{3/2}\frac{\pi a^3_{\rm ex}}{v}f_{\rm ex}$.

Here $m=m_e+m_h$ is the exciton effective mass, $\mu=(m_e^{-1}+m_h^{-1})^{-1}$ is its reduced mass, $E_{\rm ex}$ is the exciton ionization energy, $E_i$ is the binding energy of the exciton to impurity, and $m_e$ and $m_h$ are the electron and hole effective masses.

Giant oscillator strength for shallow trapped excitons results in their short radiative lifetimes

$\tau_i\approx\frac{3m_0c^3}{2e^2n\omega_i^2f_i} .$

Here $m_0$ is the electron mass in vacuum, $c$ is the speed of light, $n$ is the refraction index, and $\omega_i$ is the frequency of emitted light. Typical values of $\tau_i$ are about nanoseconds, and these short radiative lifetimes favor the radiative recombination of excitons over the non-radiative one. When quantum yield of radiative emission is high, the process can be considered as resonance fluorescence.

Similar effects exist for optical transitions between exciton and biexciton states.

An alternative description of the same phenomenon is in terms of polaritons: giant cross-sections of the resonance scattering of electronic polaritons on impurities and lattice defects.

== Bound excitons in semiconductors: Experiment ==
While specific values of $f_i$ and $\tau_i$ are not universal and change within collections of specimens, typical values confirm the above regularities. In CdS, with $E_i\approx6$ meV, were observed impurity-exciton oscillator strengths $f_i\approx 10$. The value $f_i>1$ per a single impurity center should not be surprising because the transition is a collective process including many electrons in the region of the volume of about $a_i^3>>v$. High oscillator strength results in low-power optical saturation and radiative life times $\tau_i\approx 500$ ps. Similarly, radiative life times of about 1 ns were reported for impurity excitons in GaAs. The same mechanism is responsible for short radiative times down to 100 ps for excitons confined in CuCl microcrystallites.

== Bound molecular excitons ==
Similarly, spectra of weakly trapped molecular excitons are also strongly influenced by adjacent exciton bands. It is an important property of typical molecular crystals with two or more symmetrically-equivalent molecules in the elementary cell, such as benzine and naphthalene, that their exciton absorption spectra consist of doublets (or multiplets) of bands strongly polarized along the crystal axes as was demonstrated by Antonina Prikhot'ko. This splitting of strongly polarized absorption bands that originated from the same molecular level and is known as the 'Davydov splitting' is the primary manifestation of molecular excitons. If the low-frequency component of the exciton multiplet is situated at the bottom of the exciton energy spectrum, then the absorption band of an impurity exciton approaching the bottom from below is enhanced in this component of the spectrum and reduced in two other components; in the spectroscopy of molecular excitons this phenomenon is sometimes referred to as the 'Rashba effect'. As a result, the polarization ratio of an impurity exciton band depends on its spectral position and becomes indicative of the energy spectrum of free excitons. In large organic molecules the energy of impurity excitons can be shifted gradually by changing the isotopic content of guest molecules. Building on this option, Vladimir Broude developed a method of studying the energy spectrum of excitons in the host crystal by changing the isotopic content of guest molecules. Interchanging the host and the guest allows studying energy spectrum of excitons from the top. The isotopic technique has been more recently applied to study the energy transport in biological systems.

== See also ==
- Exciton
- Polariton
- Oscillator strength
- Quantum yield
- Resonance fluorescence
