= Fine electronic structure =

Unique features in the electronic bands of a given material

In solid state physics and physical chemistry, the fine electronic structure of a solid are the features of the electronic bands induced by intrinsic interactions between charge carriers. Valence and conduction bands split slightly compared to the difference between the various bands. Some mechanisms that allow it are angular momentum couplings, spin-orbit coupling, lattice distortions (Jahn–Teller effect), and other interactions described by crystal field theory.

The name comes from the fine structure of atoms, where energy levels suffer from a similar effect from the non-relativistic calculation due to effects like spin–orbit interaction, zitterbewegung, and corrections to the kinetic energy.

== See also ==
- Fine structure constant
- Rashba effect
- Dresselhaus effect
