= Luttinger's theorem =

Theorem in condensed matter physics

Luttinger's theorem relates a Fermi liquid's particle density to the volume of its Fermi surface.

In condensed matter physics, Luttinger's theorem is a result derived by J. M. Luttinger and J. C. Ward in 1960 that has broad implications in the field of electron transport. It arises frequently in theoretical models of correlated electrons, such as the high-temperature superconductors, and in photoemission, where a metal's Fermi surface can be directly observed.

== Definition ==
Luttinger's theorem states that the volume enclosed by a material's Fermi surface is directly proportional to the particle density.

While the theorem is an immediate result of the Pauli exclusion principle in the case of noninteracting particles, it remains true even as interactions between particles are taken into consideration provided that the appropriate definitions of Fermi surface and particle density are adopted. Specifically, in the interacting case the Fermi surface must be defined according to the criteria that

$G(\omega=0,\,p) \to 0$ or $\infty,$

where $G$ is the single-particle Green function in terms of frequency and momentum. Then Luttinger's theorem can be recast into the form

$$n = 2 \int_{\mathcal{Re\,}G(\omega=0,k)>0}\frac{d^D k}{(2\pi)^D}$$,

where $\mathcal{Re\,}G$ is the real part of the above Green function and $d^D k$ is the differential volume of $k$-space in $D$ dimensions.

== See also ==
- Fermi liquid
- Fermi surface
- Luttinger–Ward functional
