= Luttinger parameter =

In semiconductors, valence bands are well characterized by 3 Luttinger parameters. At the Г-point in the band structure, $p_{3/2}$ and $p_{1/2}$ orbitals form valence bands. But spin–orbit coupling splits sixfold degeneracy into high energy 4-fold and lower energy 2-fold bands. Again 4-fold degeneracy is lifted into heavy- and light hole bands by phenomenological Hamiltonian by J. M. Luttinger.

== Three valence band state ==
In the presence of spin–orbit interaction, total angular momentum should take part in. From the three valence bands, l=1 and s=1/2 state generate six states of $\left| j, m_j \right\rangle$ as $\left| \frac{3}{2}, \pm \frac{3}{2} \right\rangle, \left| \frac{3}{2}, \pm \frac{1}{2} \right\rangle, \left| \frac{1}{2}, \pm \frac{1}{2} \right\rangle$

The spin–orbit interaction from the relativistic quantum mechanics, lowers the energy of $j = \frac{1}{2}$ states down.

== Phenomenological Hamiltonian for the j=3/2 states ==
Phenomenological Hamiltonian in spherical approximation is written as

$H= {{\hbar^2} \over {2m_0}} [(\gamma _1+{{5} \over {2}} \gamma _2) \mathbf{k}^2 -2\gamma_2 (\mathbf{k} \cdot \mathbf{J})^2]$

Phenomenological Luttinger parameters $\gamma _i$ are defined as

$\alpha = \gamma _1 + {5 \over 2} \gamma _2$

and

$\beta = \gamma _2$

If we take $\mathbf{k}$ as $\mathbf{k}=k \hat{e}_z$, the Hamiltonian is diagonalized for $j=3/2$ states.

$E = { {\hbar^2 k^2} \over {2m_0} }( \gamma _1 + {{5} \over {2}} \gamma _2 - 2 \gamma _2 m_j^2)$

Two degenerated resulting eigenenergies are

$E _{hh} = { {\hbar^2 k^2} \over {2m_0} }( \gamma _1 - 2 \gamma _2)$ for $m_j = \pm {3 \over 2}$

$E _{lh} = { {\hbar^2 k^2} \over {2m_0} }( \gamma _1 + 2 \gamma _2)$ for $m_j = \pm {1 \over 2}$

$E_{hh}$ ($E_{lh}$) indicates heav-(light-) hole band energy. If we regard the electrons as nearly free electrons, the Luttinger parameters describe effective mass of electron in each bands.

== Example: GaAs ==
In gallium arsenide,

$\epsilon _{h,l} = - {{1} \over {2}} \gamma _{1} k^{2} \pm [ {\gamma_{2}}^{2} k^{4} + 3 ({\gamma _{3}}^{2} - {\gamma _{2}}^{2} ) \times ( {k_{x}}^{2} {k_{z}}^{2} + {k_{x}}^{2} {k_{y}}^{2} + {k_{y}}^{2}{k_{z}}^{2})]^{1/2}$
