= Vladimir Broude =

Soviet-Russian experimental physicist of Jewish descent

Vladimir Lvovich Broude (December 1, 1924, Moscow, Soviet Union – June 22, 1978, Moscow), was a Soviet and Russian experimental physicist of Jewish descent. His father was a Professor of biochemistry and his mother was a medical doctor. His elder brother Yevgeny was conscripted soon after beginning of the Nazi invasion in June 1941 and lost his life.

== Career ==
In 1947, Broude graduated from the Moscow Institute of Chemical Engineering and was directed to Kyiv, to the Institute of Physics of the National Academy of Sciences of Ukraine, for developing and installing equipment for low-temperature optical spectroscopy. Here he developed interest in the low-temperature spectroscopy, studied quantum mechanics and group theory, and very soon became an active and inventive experimental physicist.

In his first break-through papers Broude discovered in the low-temperature spectra of crystalline benzine a triplet of absorption bands strongly polarized along the crystallographic axes. Methodically, this success was only possible thanks to a breakthrough in experimental techniques, the invention of a microprocessor that allowed taking spectra of minor crystallites in polarized light. This experimental result also was of crucial scientific importance because it provided a firm scientific ground for identification strongly polarized absorption bands in the spectra of molecular crystals with exciton multipletes. For these reasons, Broude' papers of the spectra of benzine nearly immediately became the classics.

The next great achievement of Broude was developing a technique for getting the information on energy spectra of excitons in perfect crystals from optical spectra of isotopic solutions. This started with the spectra of dilute solutions in which the giant oscillator strength of impurity excitons was identified and the position of lower energy band of crystalline naphthalene was established. Afterwards the technique was generalized to exciton spectra of mixed crystals in a wide range of concentrations. This resulted in the discovery of the multimode regime in the impurity-exciton bands of disordered systems. Isototic technique initiated by Broude found application in investigations of energy transport in biological systems.

In 1966, Broude moved to Chernogolovka (Moscow district) to a newly established Institute of Solid State Physics, where he founded a Laboratory of optics and spectroscopy.

Broude was a co-recipient of the 1966 Lenin Prize for discovery of excitons.

== See also ==
- Exciton
- Giant oscillator strength
- Emmanuel Rashba
