= Journal of Luminescence =

- Discipline: Physics
- Language: English
- Edited by: Xueyuan Chen

Publication details
- History: 1975-present
- Publisher: Elsevier
- Open access: Hybrid
- Impact factor: 3.8 (2025)

Standard abbreviations
- ISO 4: J. Lumin.

Indexing
- ISSN: 0022-2313

Links
- Journal homepage

The Journal of Luminescence is a monthly peer-reviewed scientific journal published by Elsevier. The editor-in-chief is Xueyuan Chen (Chinese Academy of Sciences). According to the Journal Citation Reports, the journal has a 2025 impact factor of 3.8. The journal covers all aspects related to the emission of light (luminescence).
