= Luttinger–Kohn model =

Physical model for semiconductors

The Luttinger–Kohn model is a flavor of the k·p perturbation theory used for calculating the structure of multiple, degenerate electronic bands in bulk and quantum well semiconductors. The method is a generalization of the single band k·p theory.

In this model, the influence of all other bands is taken into account by using Löwdin's perturbation method.

== Background ==
All bands can be subdivided into two classes:

- Class A: six valence bands (heavy hole, light hole, split off band and their spin counterparts) and two conduction bands.
- Class B: all other bands.

The method concentrates on the bands in Class A, and takes into account Class B bands perturbatively.

We can write the perturbed solution, $\phi^{}_{}$, as a linear combination of the unperturbed eigenstates $\phi^{(0)}_{i}$:

$$\phi = \sum^{A,B}_{n} a_{n} \phi^{(0)}_{n}$$

Assuming the unperturbed eigenstates are orthonormalized, the eigenequations are:

$$(E-H_{mm})a_m = \sum^{A}_{n\neq m}H_{mn}a_{n} + \sum^{B}_{\alpha \neq m}H_{m\alpha}a_{\alpha}$$,

where

$$H_{mn} = \int \phi^{(0)\dagger}_{m} H  \phi^{(0)}_{n}d^3 \mathbf{r} = E^{(0)}_{n}\delta_{mn}+H^{'}_{mn}$$.

From this expression, we can write:

$$a_{m} = \sum^{A}_{n\neq m} \frac{H_{mn}}{E-H_{mm}} a_{n} + \sum^{B}_{\alpha\neq m} \frac{H_{m\alpha}}{E-H_{mm}} a_{\alpha}$$,

where the first sum on the right-hand side is over the states in class A only, while the second sum is over the states on class B. Since we are interested in the coefficients $a_{m}$ for m in class A, we may eliminate those in class B by an iteration procedure to obtain:

$$a_{m} = \sum^{A}_{n} \frac{U^{A}_{mn} - \delta_{mn} H_{mn}}{E-H_{mm}} a_{n}$$,

$$U^{A}_{mn} = H_{mn} + \sum^{B}_{\alpha\neq m} \frac{H_{m\alpha}H_{\alpha n}}{E-H_{\alpha\alpha}} + \sum_{\alpha,\beta\neq m,n;\alpha\neq\beta} \frac{H_{m \alpha} H_{\alpha\beta}H_{\beta n} }{(E-H_{\alpha\alpha})(E-H_{\beta\beta})} + \ldots$$

Equivalently, for $a_{n}$ ($n \in A$):

$$a_{n} = \sum^{A}_{n} (U^{A}_{mn} - E\delta_{mn})a_{n} = 0,   m \in A$$

and

$$a_{\gamma} = \sum^{A}_{n} \frac{ U^{A}_{\gamma n} - H_{\gamma n}\delta_{\gamma n}}{E-H_{\gamma\gamma}} a_{n} = 0,   \gamma \in B$$.

When the coefficients $a_{n}$ belonging to Class A are determined, so are $a_{\gamma}$.

== Schrödinger equation and basis functions ==
The Hamiltonian including the spin-orbit interaction can be written as:

$$H = H_0 + \frac{\hbar}{4m_{0}^{2}c^{2}}\bar{\sigma}\cdot\nabla V \times \mathbf{p}$$,

where $\bar{\sigma}$ is the Pauli spin matrix vector. Substituting into the Schrödinger equation in Bloch approximation we obtain

$$H u_{n\mathbf{k}}(\mathbf{r}) = \left( H_0 + \frac{\hbar}{m_{0}}\mathbf{k}\cdot\mathbf{\Pi} + \frac{\hbar^2 k^2}{4m_{0}^{2}c^{2}} \nabla V \times \mathbf{p} \cdot \bar{\sigma} \right) u_{n\mathbf{k}}(\mathbf{r}) = E_{n}(\mathbf{k}) u_{n\mathbf{k}}(\mathbf{r})$$,

where

$$\mathbf{\Pi} = \mathbf{p} + \frac{\hbar}{4m_{0}^{2}c^{2}}\bar{\sigma} \times \nabla V$$

and the perturbation Hamiltonian can be defined as

$$H' = \frac{\hbar}{m_0}\mathbf{k}\cdot\mathbf{\Pi}.$$

The unperturbed Hamiltonian refers to the band-edge spin-orbit system (for k=0). At the band edge, the conduction band Bloch waves exhibits s-like symmetry, while the valence band states are p-like (3-fold degenerate without spin). Let us denote these states as $|S \rangle$, and $|X \rangle$, $|Y \rangle$ and $|Z \rangle$ respectively. These Bloch functions can be pictured as periodic repetition of atomic orbitals, repeated at intervals corresponding to the lattice spacing. The Bloch function can be expanded in the following manner:

$$u_{n \mathbf{k}} (\mathbf{r}) = \sum^{A}_{j'} a_{j'}(\mathbf{k}) u_{j'0}(\mathbf{r}) + \sum^{B}_{\gamma} a_{\gamma}(\mathbf{k}) u_{\gamma 0}(\mathbf{r})$$,

where j' is in Class A and $\gamma$ is in Class B. The basis functions can be chosen to be

$$u_{10}(\mathbf{r}) = u_{el}(\mathbf{r}) = \left | S\frac{1}{2},\frac{1}{2} \right \rangle = \left|S\uparrow\right\rangle$$
$$u_{20}(\mathbf{r}) = u_{SO}(\mathbf{r}) = \left | \frac{1}{2},\frac{1}{2} \right \rangle = \frac{1}{\sqrt 3} |(X+iY)\downarrow\rangle + \frac{1}{\sqrt 3} |Z\uparrow\rangle$$
$$u_{30}(\mathbf{r}) = u_{lh}(\mathbf{r}) = \left | \frac{3}{2},\frac{1}{2} \right \rangle = -\frac{1}{\sqrt 6} |(X+iY)\downarrow\rangle + \sqrt{\frac{2}{3}} |Z\uparrow\rangle$$
$$u_{40}(\mathbf{r}) = u_{hh}(\mathbf{r}) = \left | \frac{3}{2},\frac{3}{2} \right \rangle = -\frac{1}{\sqrt 2}|(X+iY)\uparrow\rangle$$
$$u_{50}(\mathbf{r}) = \bar{u}_{el}(\mathbf{r}) = \left | S\frac{1}{2},-\frac{1}{2} \right \rangle  = -|S\downarrow\rangle$$
$$u_{60}(\mathbf{r}) = \bar{u}_{SO}(\mathbf{r}) = \left | \frac{1}{2},-\frac{1}{2} \right \rangle = \frac{1}{\sqrt 3} |(X-iY)\uparrow\rangle - \frac{1}{\sqrt 3} |Z\downarrow\rangle$$
$$u_{70}(\mathbf{r}) = \bar{u}_{lh}(\mathbf{r}) = \left | \frac{3}{2},-\frac{1}{2} \right \rangle  = \frac{1}{\sqrt 6} |(X-iY)\uparrow\rangle + \sqrt{\frac{2}{3}} |Z\downarrow\rangle$$
$$u_{80}(\mathbf{r}) = \bar{u}_{hh}(\mathbf{r}) = \left | \frac{3}{2},-\frac{3}{2} \right \rangle =  -\frac{1}{\sqrt 2}|(X-iY)\downarrow\rangle$$.

Using Löwdin's method, only the following eigenvalue problem needs to be solved

$$\sum^{A}_{j'} (U^{A}_{jj'}-E\delta_{jj'})a_{j'}(\mathbf{k}) = 0,$$

where

$$U^{A}_{jj'} = H_{jj'} +  \sum^{B}_{\gamma \neq j,j'} \frac{H_{j\gamma}H_{\gamma j'}}{E_0-E_{\gamma}} =  H_{jj'} +  \sum^{B}_{\gamma \neq j,j'} \frac{H^{'}_{j\gamma}H^{'}_{\gamma j'}}{E_0-E_{\gamma}}$$,

$$H^{'}_{j\gamma} = \left \langle u_{j0} \right | \frac{\hbar}{m_0} \mathbf{k} \cdot \left ( \mathbf{p} + \frac{\hbar}{4 m_0 c^2} \bar{\sigma} \times \nabla V \right ) \left | u_{\gamma 0} \right \rangle \approx \sum_{\alpha} \frac{\hbar k_{\alpha}}{m_0}p^{\alpha}_{j \gamma}.$$

The second term of $\Pi$ can be neglected compared to the similar term with p instead of k. Similarly to the single band case, we can write for $U^{A}_{jj'}$

$$D_{jj'} \equiv U^{A}_{jj'} = E_{j}(0)\delta_{jj'} + \sum_{\alpha\beta} D^{\alpha\beta}_{jj'}k_{\alpha}k_{\beta},$$

$$D^{\alpha\beta}_{jj'} = \frac{\hbar^2}{2 m_0} \left [ \delta_{jj'}\delta_{\alpha\beta} + \sum^{B}_{\gamma} \frac{ p^{\alpha}_{j\gamma}p^{\beta}_{\gamma j'} + p^{\beta}_{j\gamma}p^{\alpha}_{\gamma j'} }{ m_0 (E_0-E_{\gamma}) } \right ].$$

We now define the following parameters

$$A_0 = \frac{\hbar^2}{2 m_0} + \frac{\hbar^2}{m_0^2} \sum^{B}_{\gamma} \frac{ p^{x}_{x\gamma}p^{x}_{\gamma x} }{ E_0-E_{\gamma} },$$

$$B_0 = \frac{\hbar^2}{2 m_0} + \frac{\hbar^2}{m_0^2} \sum^{B}_{\gamma} \frac{ p^{y}_{x\gamma}p^{y}_{\gamma x} }{ E_0-E_{\gamma} },$$

$$C_0 = \frac{\hbar^2}{m_0^2} \sum^{B}_{\gamma} \frac{ p^{x}_{x\gamma}p^{y}_{\gamma y} + p^{y}_{x\gamma}p^{x}_{\gamma y} }{ E_0-E_{\gamma} },$$

and the band structure parameters (or the Luttinger parameters) can be defined to be

$$\gamma_1 = - \frac{1}{3} \frac{2 m_0}{\hbar^2} (A_0 + 2B_0),$$

$$\gamma_2 = - \frac{1}{6} \frac{2 m_0}{\hbar^2} (A_0 - B_0),$$

$$\gamma_3 = - \frac{1}{6} \frac{2 m_0}{\hbar^2} C_0,$$

These parameters are very closely related to the effective masses of the holes in various valence bands. $\gamma_1$ and $\gamma_2$ describe the coupling of the $|X \rangle$, $|Y \rangle$ and $|Z \rangle$ states to the other states. The third parameter $\gamma_3$ relates to the anisotropy of the energy band structure around the $\Gamma$ point when $\gamma_2 \neq \gamma_3$.

== Explicit Hamiltonian matrix ==
The Luttinger-Kohn Hamiltonian $\mathbf{D_{jj'}}$ can be written explicitly as a 8X8 matrix (taking into account 8 bands - 2 conduction, 2 heavy-holes, 2 light-holes and 2 split-off)

$$\mathbf{H} = \left(  \begin{array}{cccccccc}
E_{el} & P_z & \sqrt{2}P_z & -\sqrt{3}P_{+} & 0 & \sqrt{2}P_{-} & P_{-} & 0 \\
P_z^{\dagger} & P+\Delta & \sqrt{2}Q^{\dagger} & -S^{\dagger}/\sqrt{2} & -\sqrt{2}P_{+}^{\dagger} & 0 &  -\sqrt{3/2}S &   -\sqrt{2}R \\
E_{el} & P_z & \sqrt{2}P_z & -\sqrt{3}P_{+} & 0 & \sqrt{2}P_{-} & P_{-} & 0 \\
E_{el} & P_z & \sqrt{2}P_z & -\sqrt{3}P_{+} & 0 & \sqrt{2}P_{-} & P_{-} & 0 \\
E_{el} & P_z & \sqrt{2}P_z & -\sqrt{3}P_{+} & 0 & \sqrt{2}P_{-} & P_{-} & 0 \\
E_{el} & P_z & \sqrt{2}P_z & -\sqrt{3}P_{+} & 0 & \sqrt{2}P_{-} & P_{-} & 0 \\
E_{el} & P_z & \sqrt{2}P_z & -\sqrt{3}P_{+} & 0 & \sqrt{2}P_{-} & P_{-} & 0 \\
E_{el} & P_z & \sqrt{2}P_z & -\sqrt{3}P_{+} & 0 & \sqrt{2}P_{-} & P_{-} & 0 \\
\end{array} \right)$$
