= Evan O'Neill Kane (physicist) =

American physicist

Evan O'Neill Kane (December 23, 1924 – March 23, 2006), known as E. O. Kane in his publications, was an American physicist who established some of the basic understanding of the theory of semiconductors that are now used in consumer and other electronics. He was one of the main developers of the k·p perturbation theory which is used to calculate band structures.

== Ancestry ==
Kane's great, great uncle, Elisha Kent Kane, was an arctic explorer, writing books in the 1850s about his journeys. His great grandfather, Thomas Leiper Kane, who founded the town of Kane, Pennsylvania, was an American Civil War General. He also helped with the Underground Railroad and successfully urged the Buchanan Administration not to go to war with the Mormons in Salt Lake City. Kane's grandfather, also named Evan O'Neill Kane, was a doctor who was so enamoured of the idea of local anesthesia that he surgically removed his own appendix to show its effectiveness.

== Life ==
Kane was born on December 23, 1924 in Kane, Pennsylvania. His father, Thomas Leiper Kane, died in 1933 of pneumonia. He later moved with his mother and siblings to Daytona Beach, Florida, where he stayed through high school.

=== Career ===
Kane was an undergraduate at Princeton University, and interrupted his education to serve in the army during World War II. He graduated from Princeton University in 1948, and went directly to Cornell University to study towards his PhD in physics, which was awarded in 1953 on an experimental project related to vacuum tube technology. Kane then joined the General Electric Research Laboratory in Schenectady, New York. There he began contributing to the theoretical underpinnings of the then-new field of semiconductor research. He published widely in scientific journals. Perhaps his best known paper was published in 1956 on a technique to calculate the structure of solids. This technique is referred to as the k·p method for band structure calculations.

Kane left General Electric in 1959 to join Hughes Aircraft in California and then moved to the Theoretical Physics Department in Bell Laboratories in Murray Hill, New Jersey in 1961. He continued his semiconductor research at Bell Labs, at the interface between experimental and theoretical physics, until AT&T was broken up. He then worked for BellCore until he retired in 1984.

=== Personal life ===
Kane married Anne Bassler in 1950 in Lancaster, Pennsylvania. They lived together for over 40 years in New Providence, New Jersey, where they raised three children and coauthored one paper.

In 1974, he became ranked second in the country in the 50 and over marathon category. He spent most of the rest of his life working in childcare for infants, toddlers and young children including his grandchildren and church group. He died in 2006 at the age of 81. The cause of death was complications secondary to myeloproliferative disease and myelodysplasia. He had three children.

== Kane model ==
Kane used the k·p perturbation method to determine what became known as the Kane model or Kane Hamiltonian of the structure of energy bands of semiconductors. The Kane Hamiltonian describes the valence and conduction bands in sp^{3} bonded semiconductors: the group IV, III-V and II-VI semiconductors. This 1957 publication is still prominent in scientific literature and textbooks more than 50 years after its discovery (the paper has about 3377 citations despite the fact that modern citation indexes undercount citations for papers published before the mid-1990s). The model is now often cited via books where it is discussed, most notably in Yu's and Cardona's book, Fundamentals of Semiconductors.

In their book on the k·p method, Voon and Willatzen devote several chapters to explaining Kane models. They note that Kane's quasi-degenerate perturbation theory approach worked well for semiconductors with small band gaps. Kane improved previous valence band models by adding the lowest conduction band. This model was extended later to take into account the non-parabolicity of materials such as gallium arsenide (GaAs). The model explains essentially most of the materials used in semiconductor technology. The theoretical literature describing the electronics and optical responses of these semiconductors all rely heavily on this model, as does the very active field of quantum phenomena in size-limited crystalline structures.

== Selected publications ==
- Kane, E. O. (1956). "ENERGY BAND STRUCTURE IN P-TYPE GERMANIUM AND SILICON." Journal of Physics and Chemistry of Solids 1(1-2): 82-99. (cited by 721)
- Kane, E. O. (1957). "BAND STRUCTURE OF INDIUM ANTIMONIDE." Journal of Physics and Chemistry of Solids 1(4): 249-261. (cited by 3377)
- Kane, E. O. (1959). "THE SEMI-EMPIRICAL APPROACH TO BAND STRUCTURE." Journal of Physics and Chemistry of Solids 8: 38-44. (cited by 28)
- Kane, E. O. (1959). "ZENER TUNNELING IN SEMICONDUCTORS." Journal of Physics and Chemistry of Solids 12(2): 181-188. (cited by 749)
- Kane, E. O. (1961). "THEORY OF TUNNELING." Journal of Applied Physics 32(1): 83-&. (cited by 778)
- Kane, E. O. (1963). "THOMAS-FERMI APPROACH TO IMPURE SEMICONDUCTOR BAND STRUCTURE." Physical Review 131(1): 79-&. (cited by 691)
- Kane, E. O. (1967). "ELECTRON SCATTERING BY PAIR PRODUCTION IN SILICON." Physical Review 159(3): 624-&. (cited by 481)
- Chandrasekhar, M., Cardona, M. and Kane, E. O. (1977). "INTRABAND RAMAN-SCATTERING BY FREE CARRIERS IN HEAVILY DOPED N-SI." Physical Review B 16(8): 3579-3595. (cited by 66)
- Kane, E. O. and A. B. Kane (1978). "DIRECT CALCULATION OF WANNIER FUNCTIONS - SI VALENCE BANDS." Physical Review B 17(6): 2691-2704. (cited by 53)
- Baraff, G. A., E. O. Kane and M. Schlueter (1980). "THEORY OF THE SILICON VACANCY - AN ANDERSON NEGATIVE-U SYSTEM." Physical Review B 21(12): 5662-5686. (cited by 447)
