= Spin–orbit interaction =

Relativistic interaction in quantum physics

In quantum mechanics, the spin–orbit interaction (also called spin–orbit effect or spin–orbit coupling) is a relativistic interaction of a particle's spin with its motion inside a potential. A key example of this phenomenon is the spin–orbit interaction leading to shifts in an electron's atomic energy levels, due to electromagnetic interaction between the electron's magnetic dipole, its orbital motion, and the electrostatic field of the positively charged nucleus. This phenomenon is detectable as a splitting of spectral lines, which can be thought of as a Zeeman effect product of two effects: the apparent magnetic field seen from the electron perspective due to special relativity and the magnetic moment of the electron associated with its intrinsic spin due to quantum mechanics.

For atoms, energy level splitting produced by the spin–orbit interaction is usually of the same order in size as the relativistic corrections to the kinetic energy and the zitterbewegung effect. The addition of these three corrections is known as the fine structure. The interaction between the magnetic field created by the electron and the magnetic moment of the nucleus is a slighter correction to the energy levels known as the hyperfine structure.

A similar effect, due to the relationship between angular momentum and the strong nuclear force, occurs for protons and neutrons moving inside the nucleus, leading to a shift in their energy levels in the nuclear shell model. In the field of spintronics, spin–orbit effects for electrons in semiconductors and other materials are explored for technological applications. The spin–orbit interaction is at the origin of magnetocrystalline anisotropy and the spin Hall effect.

The interaction was first introduced by Llewellyn Thomas in 1926.

== In atomic energy levels ==
Fine and hyperfine structure in hydrogen (not to scale).

This section presents a relatively simple and quantitative description of the spin–orbit interaction for an electron bound to a hydrogen-like atom, up to first order in perturbation theory, using some semiclassical electrodynamics and non-relativistic quantum mechanics. This gives results that agree reasonably well with observations.

A rigorous calculation of the same result would use relativistic quantum mechanics, using the Dirac equation, and would include many-body interactions. Achieving an even more precise result would involve calculating small corrections from quantum electrodynamics.

=== Energy of a magnetic moment ===
The energy of a magnetic moment in a magnetic field is given by
$$\Delta H = -\boldsymbol{\mu}\cdot\mathbf{B},$$
where μ is the magnetic moment of the particle, and B is the magnetic field it experiences.

=== Magnetic field ===
We shall deal with the magnetic field first. Although in the rest frame of the nucleus, there is no magnetic field acting on the electron, there is one in the rest frame of the electron (see classical electromagnetism and special relativity). Ignoring for now that this frame is not inertial, we end up with the equation
$$\mathbf{B} = -\frac{\mathbf{v} \times \mathbf{E}}{c^2},$$
where v is the velocity of the electron, and E is the electric field it travels through. (Note: In fact it's the electric field in the rest frame for the nucleus, but for $v \ll c$ there is not much difference.) Here, in the non-relativistic limit, we assume that the Lorentz factor $\gamma \backsimeq 1$. Now we know that E is radial, so we can rewrite $\mathbf{E} = \left| E \right| \frac{\mathbf{r}}{r}$. Also we know that the momentum of the electron $\mathbf{p} = m_\text{e} \mathbf{v}$. Substituting these and changing the order of the cross product (using the identity $\mathbf{A} \times \mathbf{B} = -\mathbf{B} \times \mathbf{A}$) gives
$$\mathbf{B} = \frac{\mathbf{r} \times \mathbf{p}}{m_\text{e} c^2} \left| \frac{E}{r} \right|.$$

Next, we express the electric field as the gradient of the electric potential $\mathbf{E} = -\nabla V$. Here we make the central field approximation, that is, that the electrostatic potential is spherically symmetric, so is only a function of radius. This approximation is exact for hydrogen and hydrogen-like systems. Now we can say that
$$|E| = \left|\frac{\partial V}{\partial r}\right| = \frac{1}{e} \frac{\partial U(r)}{\partial r},$$

where $U = -eV$ is the potential energy of the electron in the central field, and e is the elementary charge. Now we remember from classical mechanics that the angular momentum of a particle $\mathbf{L} = \mathbf{r} \times \mathbf{p}$. Putting it all together, we get
$$\mathbf{B} = \frac{1}{m_\text{e} ec^2} \frac{1}{r} \frac{\partial U(r)}{\partial r} \mathbf{L}.$$

At this point, B is a positive number multiplied by L, meaning that the magnetic field is parallel to the orbital angular momentum of the particle, which is itself perpendicular to the particle's velocity.

=== Spin magnetic moment of the electron ===
The spin magnetic moment of the electron is
$$\boldsymbol{\mu}_S = -g_\text{s} \mu_\text{B} \frac{\mathbf{S}}{\hbar},$$
where $\mathbf{S}$ is the spin (or intrinsic angular-momentum) vector, $\mu_\text{B}$ is the Bohr magneton, and $g_\text{s} = 2.0023... \approx 2$ is the electron-spin g-factor. Here $\boldsymbol{\mu}$ is a negative constant multiplied by the spin, so the spin magnetic moment is antiparallel to the spin.

The spin–orbit potential consists of two parts. The Larmor part is connected to the interaction of the spin magnetic moment of the electron with the magnetic field of the nucleus in the co-moving frame of the electron. The second contribution is related to Thomas precession.

=== Larmor interaction energy ===
The Larmor interaction energy is
$$\Delta H_\text{L} = -\boldsymbol{\mu} \cdot \mathbf{B}.$$

Substituting in this equation expressions for the spin magnetic moment and the magnetic field, one gets
$$\Delta H_\text{L} = \frac{g_\text{s}\mu_\text{B}}{\hbar m_\text{e} e c^2} \frac{1}{r} \frac{\partial U(r)}{\partial r} \mathbf{L} \cdot \mathbf{S} \approx \frac{2\mu_\text{B}}{\hbar m_\text{e} e c^2} \frac{1}{r} \frac{\partial U(r)}{\partial r} \mathbf{L} \cdot \mathbf{S}.$$

Now we have to take into account Thomas precession correction for the electron's curved trajectory.

=== Thomas interaction energy ===
In 1926 Llewellyn Thomas relativistically recomputed the doublet separation in the fine structure of the atom. Thomas precession rate $\boldsymbol{\Omega}_\text{T}$ is related to the angular frequency of the orbital motion $\boldsymbol{\omega}$ of a spinning particle as follows:
$$\boldsymbol{\Omega}_\text{T} = -\boldsymbol{\omega} (\gamma - 1),$$
where $\gamma$ is the Lorentz factor of the moving particle. The Hamiltonian producing the spin precession $\boldsymbol{\Omega}_\text{T}$ is given by
$$\Delta H_\text{T} = \boldsymbol{\Omega}_\text{T} \cdot \mathbf{S}.$$

To the first order in $(v/c)^2$, we obtain
$$\Delta H_\text{T} = -\frac{\mu_\text{B}}{\hbar m_\text{e} e c^2} \frac{1}{r} \frac{\partial U(r)}{\partial r} \mathbf{L}\cdot \mathbf{S}.$$

=== Total interaction energy ===
The total spin–orbit potential in an external electrostatic potential takes the form
$$\Delta H \equiv \Delta H_\text{L} + \Delta H_\text{T} = \frac{(g_\text{s}-1) \mu_\text{B}}{\hbar m_\text{e} e c^2} \frac{1}{r} \frac{\partial U(r)}{\partial r} \mathbf{L} \cdot \mathbf{S} \approx \frac{\mu_\text{B}}{\hbar m_\text{e} e c^2} \frac{1}{r} \frac{\partial U(r)}{\partial r} \mathbf{L} \cdot \mathbf{S}.$$
The net effect of Thomas precession is the reduction of the Larmor interaction energy by factor of about 1/2, which came to be known as the Thomas half.

=== Evaluating the energy shift ===
Thanks to all the above approximations, we can now evaluate the detailed energy shift in this model. Note that L_{z} and S_{z} are no longer conserved quantities. In particular, we wish to find a new basis that diagonalizes both H_{0} (the non-perturbed Hamiltonian) and ΔH. To find out what basis this is, we first define the total angular momentum operator
$$\mathbf{J} = \mathbf{L} + \mathbf{S}.$$

Taking the dot product of this with itself, we get
$$\mathbf{J}^2 = \mathbf{L}^2 + \mathbf{S}^2 + 2\, \mathbf{L} \cdot \mathbf{S}$$
(since L and S commute), and therefore
$$\mathbf{L} \cdot \mathbf{S} =
\frac{1}{2} \left(\mathbf{J}^2 - \mathbf{L}^2 - \mathbf{S}^2 \right)$$

It can be shown that the five operators H_{0}, J^{2}, L^{2}, S^{2}, and J_{z} all commute with each other and with ΔH. Therefore, the basis we were looking for is the simultaneous eigenbasis of these five operators (i.e., the basis where all five are diagonal). Elements of this basis have the five quantum numbers: $n$ (the "principal quantum number"), $j$ (the "total angular momentum quantum number"), $\ell$ (the "orbital angular momentum quantum number"), $s$ (the "spin quantum number"), and $j_z$ (the "z component of total angular momentum").

To evaluate the energies, we note that
$$\left\langle \frac{1}{r^3} \right\rangle = \frac{2}{a^3 n^3\; \ell (\ell + 1) (2\ell + 1)}$$
for hydrogenic wavefunctions (here $a = \hbar / (Z \alpha m_\text{e} c)$ is the Bohr radius divided by the nuclear charge Z); and
$$\left\langle \mathbf{L} \cdot \mathbf{S} \right\rangle = \frac{1}{2} \big(\langle \mathbf{J}^2 \rangle - \langle \mathbf{L}^2 \rangle - \langle \mathbf{S}^2 \rangle\big) = \frac{\hbar^2}{2} \big(j (j + 1) - \ell (\ell + 1) - s (s + 1)\big).$$

=== Final energy shift ===
We can now say that
$$\Delta E = \frac{\beta}{2} \big(j(j+1) - \ell(\ell+1) - s(s+1)\big),$$
where the spin-orbit coupling constant is
$$\beta = \beta(n,l) = Z^4 \frac{\mu_0}{4\pi} g_\text{s} \mu_\text{B}^2 \frac{1}{n^3 a_0^3\;\ell(\ell+1/2)(\ell+1)}.$$

For the exact relativistic result, see the solutions to the Dirac equation for a hydrogen-like atom.

The derivation above calculates the interaction energy in the (momentaneous) rest frame of the electron and in this reference frame there's a magnetic field that's absent in the rest frame of the nucleus.

Another approach is to calculate it in the rest frame of the nucleus, see for example George P. Fisher: Electric Dipole Moment of a Moving Magnetic Dipole (1971). However the rest frame calculation is sometimes avoided, because one has to account for hidden momentum.

== Scattering ==
In solid state physics and particle physics, Mott scattering describes the scattering of electrons out of an impurity which includes the spin-orbit effects. It is analogous to the Coulomb scattering (Rutherford scattering) with the addition of spin-orbit coupling. In particle physics, it is due to relativistic corrections.

== In solids ==
A crystalline solid (semiconductor, metal etc.) is characterized by its band structure. While on the overall scale (including the core levels) the spin–orbit interaction is still a small perturbation, it may play a relatively more important role if we zoom in to bands close to the Fermi level ($E_\text{F}$). The atomic $\mathbf{L} \cdot \mathbf{S}$ (spin–orbit) interaction, for example, splits bands that would be otherwise degenerate, and the particular form of this spin–orbit splitting (typically of the order of few to few hundred millielectronvolts) depends on the particular system. The bands of interest can be then described by various effective models, usually based on some perturbative approach. An example of how the atomic spin–orbit interaction influences the band structure of a crystal is explained in the article about Rashba and Dresselhaus interactions.

In crystalline solid contained paramagnetic ions, e.g. ions with unclosed d or f atomic subshell, localized electronic states exist. In this case, atomic-like electronic levels structure is shaped by intrinsic magnetic spin–orbit interactions and interactions with crystalline electric fields. Such structure is named the fine electronic structure. For rare-earth ions the spin–orbit interactions are much stronger than the crystal electric field (CEF) interactions. The strong spin–orbit coupling makes J a relatively good quantum number, because the first excited multiplet is at least ~130 meV (1500 K) above the primary multiplet. The result is that filling it at room temperature (300 K) is negligibly small. In this case, a (2J + 1)-fold degenerated primary multiplet split by an external CEF can be treated as the basic contribution to the analysis of such systems' properties. In the case of approximate calculations for basis $|J,J_z\rangle$, to determine which is the primary multiplet, the Hund principles, known from atomic physics, are applied:

- The ground state of the terms' structure has the maximal value S allowed by the Pauli exclusion principle.
- The ground state has a maximal allowed L value, with maximal S.
- The primary multiplet has a corresponding J = |L − S| when the shell is less than half full, and J = L + S, where the fill is greater.

The S, L and J of the ground multiplet are determined by Hund's rules. The ground multiplet is 2J + 1 degenerated – its degeneracy is removed by CEF interactions and magnetic interactions. CEF interactions and magnetic interactions resemble, somehow, the Stark and the Zeeman effect known from atomic physics. The energies and eigenfunctions of the discrete fine electronic structure are obtained by diagonalization of the (2J + 1)-dimensional matrix. The fine electronic structure can be directly detected by many different spectroscopic methods, including the inelastic neutron scattering (INS) experiments. The case of strong cubic CEF (for 3d transition-metal ions) interactions form group of levels (e.g. T_{2g}, A_{2g}), which are partially split by spin–orbit interactions and (if occur) lower-symmetry CEF interactions. The energies and eigenfunctions of the discrete fine electronic structure (for the lowest term) are obtained by diagonalization of the (2L + 1)(2S + 1)-dimensional matrix. At zero temperature (T = 0 K) only the lowest state is occupied. The magnetic moment at T = 0 K is equal to the moment of the ground state. It allows the evaluation of the total, spin and orbital moments. The eigenstates and corresponding eigenfunctions $|\Gamma_n\rangle$ can be found from direct diagonalization of Hamiltonian matrix containing crystal field and spin–orbit interactions. Taking into consideration the thermal population of states, the thermal evolution of the single-ion properties of the compound is established. This technique is based on the equivalent operator theory defined as the CEF widened by thermodynamic and analytical calculations defined as the supplement of the CEF theory by including thermodynamic and analytical calculations.

=== Examples of effective Hamiltonians ===
Hole bands of a bulk (3D) zinc-blende semiconductor will be split by $\Delta_0$ into heavy and light holes (which form a $\Gamma_8$ quadruplet in the $\Gamma$-point of the Brillouin zone) and a split-off band ($\Gamma_7$ doublet). Including two conduction bands ($\Gamma_6$ doublet in the $\Gamma$-point), the system is described by the effective eight-band model of Kohn and Luttinger. If only top of the valence band is of interest (for example when $E_\text{F}\ll \Delta_0$, Fermi level measured from the top of the valence band), the proper four-band effective model is
$$H_\text{KL}(k_\text{x},k_\text{y},k_\text{z}) = - \frac{\hbar^2}{2m} \left[
\left(\gamma_1 + {\tfrac 5 2 \gamma_2}\right) k^2
- 2\gamma_2 \left(J_\text{x}^2 k_\text{x}^2 + J_\text{y}^2 k_\text{y}^2 + J_\text{z}^2 k_\text{z}^2\right)
- 2\gamma_3 \sum_{m \ne n} J_m J_n k_m k_n
\right]$$
where $\gamma_{1,2,3}$ are the Luttinger parameters (analogous to the single effective mass of a one-band model of electrons) and $J_{\text{x},\text{y},\text{z}}$ are angular momentum 3/2 matrices ($m$ is the free electron mass). In combination with magnetization, this type of spin–orbit interaction will distort the electronic bands depending on the magnetization direction, thereby causing magnetocrystalline anisotropy (a special type of magnetic anisotropy). If the semiconductor moreover lacks the inversion symmetry, the hole bands will exhibit cubic Dresselhaus splitting. Within the four bands (light and heavy holes), the dominant term is
$$H_{\text{D}3}=b_{41}^{8\text{v}8\text{v}}[(k_\text{x}k_\text{y}^2-k_\text{x}k_\text{z}^2)J_\text{x}+(k_\text{y}k_\text{z}^2-k_\text{y}k_\text{x}^2)J_\text{y}+(k_\text{z}k_\text{x}^2-k_\text{z}k_\text{y}^2)J_\text{z}]$$

where the material parameter $b_{41}^{8\text{v}8\text{v}} = -81.93 \,\text{meV} \cdot \text{nm}^3$ for GaAs (see pp. 72 in Winkler's book, according to more recent data the Dresselhaus constant in GaAs is 9 eVÅ^{3}; the total Hamiltonian will be $H_\text{KL} + H_{\text{D}3}$). Two-dimensional electron gas in an asymmetric quantum well (or heterostructure) will feel the Rashba interaction. The appropriate two-band effective Hamiltonian is
$$H_0 + H_\text{R} = \frac{\hbar^2 k^2}{2m^*} \sigma_0 + \alpha (k_\text{y} \sigma_\text{x} - k_\text{x}\sigma_\text{y})$$
where $\sigma_0$ is the 2 × 2 identity matrix, $\sigma_{\text{x},\text{y}}$ the Pauli matrices and $m^*$ the electron effective mass. The spin–orbit part of the Hamiltonian, $H_\text{R}$ is parametrized by $\alpha$, sometimes called the Rashba parameter (its definition somewhat varies), which is related to the structure asymmetry.

Above expressions for spin–orbit interaction couple spin matrices $\mathbf{J}$ and $\boldsymbol{\sigma}$ to the quasi-momentum $\mathbf{k}$, and to the vector potential $\mathbf{A}$ of an AC electric field through the Peierls substitution $\mathbf{k} = -i\nabla-\frac{e}{\hbar c} \mathbf{A}$. They are lower order terms of the Luttinger–Kohn k·p perturbation theory in powers of $k$. Next terms of this expansion also produce terms that couple spin operators of the electron coordinate $\mathbf{r}$. Indeed, a cross product $(\boldsymbol{\sigma}\times{\mathbf{k}})$ is invariant with respect to time inversion. In cubic crystals, it has a symmetry of a vector and acquires a meaning of a spin–orbit contribution ${\boldsymbol{r}}_{\text{SO}}$ to the operator of coordinate. For electrons in semiconductors with a narrow gap $E_{\rm G}$ between the conduction and heavy hole bands, Yafet derived the equation
$${\mathbf{r}}_{\text{SO}} = \frac{\hbar^2g}{4m_0} \left(\frac{1}{E_{\rm G}}+\frac{1}{E_{\rm G} + \Delta_0}\right) (\boldsymbol{\sigma}\times{\mathbf{k}})$$
where $m_0$ is a free electron mass, and $g$ is a $g$-factor properly renormalized for spin–orbit interaction. This operator couples electron spin $\mathbf{S} = \tfrac{1}{2} \boldsymbol{\sigma}$ directly to the electric field $\mathbf{E}$ through the interaction energy $-e(\mathbf{r}_\text{SO} \cdot \mathbf{E} )$.

=== Oscillating electromagnetic field ===
Electric dipole spin resonance (EDSR) is the coupling of the electron spin with an oscillating electric field. Similar to the electron spin resonance (ESR) in which electrons can be excited with an electromagnetic wave with the energy given by the Zeeman effect, in EDSR the resonance can be achieved if the frequency is related to the energy band splitting given by the spin–orbit coupling in solids. While in ESR the coupling is obtained via the magnetic part of the EM wave with the electron magnetic moment, the ESDR is the coupling of the electric part with the spin and motion of the electrons. This mechanism has been proposed for controlling the spin of electrons in quantum dots and other mesoscopic systems.

== See also ==
- Angular momentum coupling
- Angular momentum diagrams (quantum mechanics)
- Electric dipole spin resonance
- Kugel–Khomskii coupling
- Lamb shift
- Relativistic angular momentum
- Spherical basis
- Stark effect

== Textbooks ==
- Condon, Edward U. & Shortley, G. H. (1935). The Theory of Atomic Spectra. Cambridge University Press. ISBN 978-0-521-09209-8.
- Griffiths, David J. (2004). Introduction to Quantum Mechanics (2nd ed.). Prentice Hall.
- Landau, Lev; Lifshitz, Evgeny. "§72. Fine structure of atomic levels". Quantum Mechanics: Non-Relativistic Theory, Volume 3.
- Yu, Peter Y.; Cardona, Manuel (1995). Fundamentals of Semiconductors. Springer.
- Winkler, Roland (2003). Spin–Orbit Coupling Effects in Two-Dimensional Electron and Hole Systems. Springer.
