= Peierls substitution =

Method to include magnetic fields in tight-binding models

The Peierls substitution method, named after the original work by Rudolf Peierls is a widely employed approximation for describing tightly-bound electrons in the presence of a slowly varying magnetic vector potential. Specifically, the Peierls substitution modifies the hopping integrals in a tight-binding Hamiltonian to account for the presence of a slowly-varying magnetic field by introducing phase factors.

== Introduction ==
The hopping integrals (or transfer integrals) describe the ability of an electron to hop between neighboring atoms. For a system described by a general Hamiltonian $H$, the hopping integral between the states $i,j$ is given by
$$t_{ij} = \langle i | H | j \rangle,$$
Since the Hamiltonian is Hermitian, the hopping integrals satisfy
$$t_{ij} = t_{ji}^{*}.$$
Thus, in the absence of a magnetic field, the hopping integrals can generally be chosen to be real, such that
$$t_{ij} = t_{ji} = t.$$
In the presence of a magnetic field, however, the hopping amplitude acquires a phase factor:
$$t_{ij} \rightarrow t_{ij} e^{i \theta_{ij}}.$$

== Formulation ==
In the presence of an external magnetic vector potential $\mathbf{A}$, the translation operators $\mathbf{T}$, which form the kinetic part of the Hamiltonian in the tight-binding framework, are simply

$$\mathbf{T}_x = |m+1,n\rangle\langle m,n|e^{i\theta^x_{m,n}}, \quad \mathbf{T}_y = |m,n+1\rangle\langle m,n|e^{i\theta^y_{m,n}},$$

where $|m,n\rangle$ are quantum states, $x,y$ are directions of the magnetic field and $e^{i\theta^x_{m,n}},e^{i\theta^y_{m,n}}$ are the phases introduced to the states due the external magnetic field. In the second quantization formulation these translation operators are given with

$$\mathbf{T}_x = \boldsymbol{\psi}^\dagger_{m+1,n}\boldsymbol{\psi}_{m,n}e^{i\theta^x_{m,n}}, \quad \mathbf{T}_y = \boldsymbol{\psi}^\dagger_{m,n+1}\boldsymbol{\psi}_{m,n}e^{i\theta^y_{m,n}},$$

where $\boldsymbol{\psi}_{m,n}, \boldsymbol{\psi}^\dagger_{m,n}$ are annihilation and creation operators acting on state $|m,n \rangle$. The phases are defined as

$$\theta^x_{m,n} = \frac{q}{\hbar}\int_m^{m+1} A_x(x,n)\text{d}x, \quad \theta^y_{m,n} = \frac{q}{\hbar}\int_n^{n+1} A_y(m,y) \text{d}y.$$

== Properties ==
1. The number of flux quanta per plaquette $\phi_{mn}$ is related to the lattice curl of the phase factor,
  $$\begin{align}
\boldsymbol{\nabla}\times\theta_{m,n}& = \Delta_x\theta^y_{m,n}-\Delta_y\theta^x_{m,n} = \left(\theta^y_{m+1,n}-\theta^y_{m,n}-\theta^x_{m,n+1}+\theta^x_{m,n}\right)\\
& = \frac{q}{\hbar}\int_{\text{unit cell}}\mathbf{A}\cdot \text{d}\mathbf{l} = 2\pi\frac{q}{h}\int \mathbf{B} \cdot \text{d}\mathbf{s} = 2\pi\phi_{m,n}
\end{align}$$
  and the total flux through the lattice is $\Phi = \Phi_0\sum_{m,n}\phi_{m,n}$ with $\Phi_0 = hc/e$ being the magnetic flux quantum in Gaussian units.
2. The flux quanta per plaquette $\phi_{mn}$ is related to the accumulated phase of a single particle state, $|\psi\rangle = \boldsymbol{\psi}_{i,j}|0\rangle$ surrounding a plaquette:

$$\begin{align}
\mathbf{T}_y^\dagger \mathbf{T}_x^\dagger \mathbf{T}_y\mathbf{T}_x|\psi\rangle& = \mathbf{T}_y^\dagger \mathbf{T}_x^\dagger \mathbf{T}_y |i+1,j\rangle e^{i\theta^x_{i,j}} = \mathbf{T}_y^\dagger \mathbf{T}_x^\dagger |i+1,j+1\rangle e^{i\left( \theta^x_{i,j}+\theta^y_{i+1,j} \right)}\\
& = \mathbf{T}_y^\dagger |i,j+1\rangle e^{i\left( \theta^x_{i,j}+\theta^y_{i+1,j}-\theta^x_{i,j+1} \right)} =
|i,j\rangle e^{i\left( \theta^x_{i,j}+\theta^y_{i+1,j}-\theta^x_{i,j+1}-\theta^y_{i,j} \right)} = |i,j\rangle e^{i2\pi \phi_{m,n}}.
\end{align}$$

== Justification ==
Here we give three derivations of the Peierls substitution, each one is based on a different formulation of quantum mechanics theory.

=== Axiomatic approach ===
Here we give a simple derivation of the Peierls substitution, which is based on The Feynman Lectures (Vol. III, Chapter 21). This derivation postulates that magnetic fields are incorporated in the tight-binding model by adding a phase to the hopping terms and show that it is consistent with the continuum Hamiltonian. Thus, our starting point is the Hofstadter Hamiltonian:

$$H_0 = \sum_{m,n}\bigg(-te^{i\theta^x_{m,n}}\vert m\!+\!a,n \rangle \langle m,n\vert -te^{i\theta_{m,n}^y}\vert m,n\!+\!a\rangle\langle m,n\vert
-\epsilon_0\vert m,n\rangle\langle m,n\vert\bigg)+ \text{h.c}.$$

The translation operator $\vert m+1\rangle\langle m\vert$ can be written explicitly using its generator, that is the momentum operator. Under this representation its easy to expand it up to the second order,

$$\vert m\!+\!a\rangle\langle m\vert = \exp{\bigg(\!-\!\frac{i \mathbf{p}_xa}{\hbar}\bigg)}\vert m\rangle\langle m\vert
= \left(1-\frac{i\mathbf{p}_x}{\hbar}a -\frac{\mathbf{p}_x^2}{2\hbar^2}a^2+\mathcal{O}(a^3) \right)\vert m\rangle\langle m\vert$$

and in a 2D lattice $\vert m\!+\!a\rangle\langle m\vert \longrightarrow\vert m\!+\!a,n\rangle\langle m,n\vert$. Next, we expand up to the second order the phase factors, assuming that the vector potential does not vary significantly over one lattice spacing (which is taken to be small)

$$\begin{align}
e^{i\theta}& = 1+i\theta-\frac{1}{2}\theta^2 + \mathcal{O}(\theta^3),\\
\theta &\approx \frac{aqA_x}{\hbar},\\
e^{i\theta}& = 1 + \frac{iaqA_x}{\hbar} - \frac{a^2q^2A^2_x}{2\hbar^2} + \mathcal{O}(a^3).
\end{align}$$

Substituting these expansions to relevant part of the Hamiltonian yields

$$\begin{align}
e^{i\theta}\vert m+a\rangle\langle m\vert +e^{-i\theta}\vert m\rangle\langle m+a\vert& = \bigg(1 + \frac{iaqA_x}{\hbar} - \frac{a^2q^2A^2_x}{2\hbar^2} + \mathcal{O}(a^3)\bigg)\bigg(1-\frac{i\mathbf{p}_x}{\hbar}a-\frac{\mathbf{p}_x^2}{2\hbar^2}a^2 +\mathcal{O}(a^3)\bigg)\vert m\rangle\langle m\vert+\text{h.c}\\
& = \bigg( 2-\frac{\mathbf{p}^2_x}{\hbar^2}a^2+\frac{q\lbrace \mathbf{p}_x,A_x \rbrace}{\hbar^2}a^2-\frac{q^2A_x^2}{\hbar^2}a^2+\mathcal{O}(a^3)\bigg) \vert m\rangle\langle m\vert\\
& = \bigg(-\frac{a^2}{\hbar^2}\big(\mathbf{p}_x-qA_x\big)^2+2+\mathcal{O}(a^3)\bigg) \vert m\rangle\langle m\vert.
\end{align}$$

Generalizing the last result to the 2D case, the we arrive to Hofstadter Hamiltonian at the continuum limit:

$$H_0 = \frac{1}{2m}\big(\mathbf{p}-q\mathbf{A}\big)^2+\tilde{\epsilon_0}$$

where the effective mass is $m = \hbar^2/2ta^2$ and $\tilde{\epsilon}_0 = \epsilon_0-4t$.

=== Semi-classical approach ===
Here we show that the Peierls phase factor originates from the propagator of an electron in a magnetic field due to the dynamical term $q\mathbf{v}\cdot\mathbf{A}$ appearing in the Lagrangian. In the path integral formalism, which generalizes the action principle of classical mechanics, the transition amplitude from site $j$ at time $t_j$ to site $i$ at time $t_i$ is given by

$$\langle\mathbf{r}_i,t_i|\mathbf{r}_j,t_j\rangle = \int_{\mathbf{r}(t_i)}^{\mathbf{r}(t_j)} \mathcal{D}[\mathbf{r}(t)]e^{\frac{\rm i}{\hbar}\mathcal{S}(\mathbf{r})},$$

where the integration operator, $\int_{\mathbf{r}(t_i)}^{\mathbf{r}(t_j)} \mathcal{D}[\mathbf{r}(t)]$ denotes the sum over all possible paths from $\mathbf{r}(t_i)$ to $\mathbf{r}(t_j)$ and $\mathcal{S}[\mathbf{r}_{ij}] = \int_{t_i}^{t_j} L[\mathbf{r}(t),\dot{\mathbf{r}}(t),t] \mathrm{d}t$ is the classical action, which is a functional that takes a trajectory as its argument. We use $\mathbf{r}_{ij}$ to denote a trajectory with endpoints at $r(t_i), r(t_j)$. The Lagrangian of the system can be written as

$$L = L^{(0)}+q\mathbf{v}\cdot\mathbf{A},$$

where $L^{(0)}$ is the Lagrangian in the absence of a magnetic field. The corresponding action reads

$$S[\mathbf{r}_{ij}] = S^{(0)}[\mathbf{r}_{ij}]+q\int_{t_i}^{t_j}dt\left(\frac{\text{d}\mathbf{r}}{\text{d}t}\right)\cdot\mathbf{A} =
S^{(0)}[\mathbf{r}_{ij}]+q\int_{\mathbf{r}_{ij}}\mathbf{A}\cdot\text{d}\mathbf{r}$$

Now, assuming that only one path contributes strongly, we have

$$\langle\mathbf{r}_i,t_i|\mathbf{r}_j,t_j\rangle = e^{\frac{iq}{\hbar}\int_{\mathbf{r}_c}\mathbf{A}\cdot\text{d}\mathbf{r}}\int_{\mathbf{r}(t_i)}^{\mathbf{r}(t_j)} \mathcal{D}[\mathbf{r}(t)]e^{\frac{\rm i}{\hbar}\mathcal{S}^{(0)}[\mathbf{r}]}$$

Hence, the transition amplitude of an electron subject to a magnetic field is the one in the absence of a magnetic field times a phase.

=== Another derivation ===
The Hamiltonian is given by

$$H = \frac{\mathbf{p}^2}{2m}+U\left(\mathbf{r}\right),$$

where $U\left(\mathbf{r}\right)$ is the potential landscape due to the crystal lattice. The Bloch theorem asserts that the solution to the problem:$H\Psi_{\mathbf{k}}(\mathbf{r}) = E\left(\mathbf{k}\right)\Psi_{\mathbf{k}}(\mathbf{r})$, is to be sought in the Bloch sum form

$$\Psi_{\mathbf{k}}(\mathbf{r}) = \frac{1}{\sqrt{N}}\sum_{\mathbf{R}}e^{i\mathbf{k}\cdot\mathbf{R}}\phi_\mathbf{R}\left(\mathbf{r}\right),$$

where $N$ is the number of unit cells, and the $\phi_\mathbf{R}$ are known as Wannier functions. The corresponding eigenvalues $E\left(\mathbf{k}\right)$, which form bands depending on the crystal momentum $\mathbf{k}$, are obtained by calculating the matrix element

$$E\left(\mathbf{k}\right) = \int d\mathbf{r}\  \Psi_\mathbf{k}^*(\mathbf{r})H\Psi_\mathbf{k}(\mathbf{r}) = \frac{1}{N}\sum_{\mathbf{R}\mathbf{R}^{\prime}}e^{i\mathbf{k}\left(\mathbf{R}^{\prime}-\mathbf{R}\right)}
\int d\mathbf{r}\ \phi^*_\mathbf{R}\left(\mathbf{r}\right)H\phi_{\mathbf{R}^{\prime}}\left(\mathbf{r}\right)$$

and ultimately depend on material-dependent hopping integrals

$$t_{12} = -\int
d\mathbf{r}\ \phi^*_{\mathbf{R}_1}\left(\mathbf{r}\right)H\phi_{\mathbf{R}_2}\left(\mathbf{r}\right).$$

In the presence of the magnetic field the Hamiltonian changes to

$$\tilde{H}(t) = \frac{\left(\mathbf{p}-q\mathbf{A}(t)\right)^2}{2m}+U\left(\mathbf{r}\right),$$

where $q$ is the charge of the particle. To amend this, consider changing the Wannier functions to

$$\begin{align}
\tilde{\phi}_\mathbf{R}(\mathbf{r}) = e^{i \frac{q}{\hbar} \int_\mathbf{R}^\mathbf{r} \mathbf{A}(\mathbf{r}',t) \cdot dr'} \phi_\mathbf{R}(\mathbf{r}),
\end{align}$$

where $\phi_\mathbf{R} \equiv \tilde{\phi}_\mathbf{R}(\mathbf{A}\to 0)$. This makes the new Bloch wave functions

$$\tilde{\Psi}_\mathbf{k}(\mathbf{r}) = \frac{1}{\sqrt{N}} \sum_{\mathbf{R}} e^{i \mathbf{k}\cdot\mathbf{R}} \tilde{\phi}_\mathbf{R}(\mathbf{r}),$$

into eigenstates of the full Hamiltonian at time $t$, with the same energy as before. To see this we first use $\mathbf{p} = -i \hbar \nabla$ to write

$$\begin{align}
\tilde{H}(t) {\tilde{\phi}_\mathbf{R}(\mathbf{r})} & = \left[ \frac{(\mathbf{p} - q\mathbf{A}(\mathbf{r},t))^2}{2m} + U(\mathbf{r}) \right] e^{i\frac{q}{\hbar} \int_\mathbf{R}^\mathbf{r} \mathbf{A}(\mathbf{r}',t) \cdot d\mathbf{r}'} \phi_\mathbf{R}(\mathbf{r}) \\
& = e^{i\frac{q}{\hbar} \int_\mathbf{R}^\mathbf{r} A(\mathbf{r}',t) \cdot d\mathbf{r}'} \left[\frac{(\mathbf{p} - q\mathbf{A}(\mathbf{r},t) + q \mathbf{A}(\mathbf{r},t))^2}{2m} + U(\mathbf{r}) \right] \phi_\mathbf{R}(\mathbf{r}) \\
& = e^{i\frac{q}{\hbar} \int_\mathbf{R}^\mathbf{r} A(\mathbf{r}',t) \cdot d\mathbf{r}'} H \phi_\mathbf{R}(\mathbf{r}).
\end{align}$$

Then when we compute the hopping integral in quasi-equilibrium (assuming that the vector potential changes slowly)

$$\begin{align}
\tilde{t}_{\mathbf{R}\mathbf{R}'}(t)& = -\int d\mathbf{r}\  \tilde{\phi}_\mathbf{R}^*(\mathbf{r})\tilde{H}(t)\tilde{\phi}_{\mathbf{R}'}(\mathbf{r}) \\
& = - \int d\mathbf{r}\ \phi_\mathbf{R}^*(\mathbf{r})e^{i\frac{q}{\hbar} \left[-\int_{\mathbf{R}}^\mathbf{r} \mathbf{A}(\mathbf{r}',t)\cdot d\mathbf{r}'+\int_{\mathbf{R}'}^\mathbf{r} \mathbf{A}(\mathbf{r}',t)\cdot d\mathbf{r}'\right] } H \phi_{\mathbf{R}'}(\mathbf{r}) \\
& = - e^{i\frac{q}{\hbar}\int_{\mathbf{R}'}^{\mathbf{R}} \mathbf{A}(\mathbf{r}',t)\cdot d\mathbf{r}' } \int d\mathbf{r}\ \phi_\mathbf{R}^*(\mathbf{r})e^{i\frac{q}{\hbar}\Phi_{\mathbf{R}',\mathbf{r},\mathbf{R}}} H \phi_{\mathbf{R}'}(\mathbf{r}),
\end{align}$$

where we have defined $\Phi_{\mathbf{R}',\mathbf{r},\mathbf{R}} = \oint_{\mathbf{R}'\to \mathbf{r} \to \mathbf{R} \to \mathbf{R}'}\mathbf{A}(\mathbf{r}',t)\cdot d\mathbf{r}'$, the flux through the triangle made by the three position arguments. Since we assume $\mathbf{A}(\mathbf{r},t)$ is approximately uniform at the lattice scale - the scale at which the Wannier states are localized to the positions $\mathbf{R}$ - we can approximate $\Phi_{\mathbf{R},\mathbf{r},\mathbf{R}'} \approx 0$, yielding the desired result,
$$\tilde{t}_{\mathbf{R}\mathbf{R}'}(t) \approx t_{\mathbf{R}\mathbf{R}'} e^{i\frac{q}{\hbar}\int_{\mathbf{R}'}^{\mathbf{R}} \mathbf{A}(\mathbf{r}',t)\cdot d\mathbf{r}' }.$$
Therefore, the matrix elements are the same as in the case without magnetic field, apart from the phase factor picked up, which is denoted the Peierls phase factor. This is tremendously convenient, since then we get to use the same material parameters regardless of the magnetic field value, and the corresponding phase is computationally trivial to take into account. For electrons ($q = -e$) it amounts to replacing the hopping term $t_{ij}$ with $t_{ij}e^{-i\frac{e}{\hbar}\int_i^j\mathbf{A}\cdot d\mathbf{l}}$

== See also ==
- Tight-binding approximation
- Hofstadter's butterfly
