= K·p perturbation theory =

Solid-state physics model

In solid-state physics, the k·p perturbation theory is an approximated semi-empirical approach for calculating the band structure (particularly effective mass) and optical properties of crystalline solids. It is pronounced "k dot p", and is also called the k·p method. This theory has been applied specifically in the framework of the Luttinger–Kohn model (after Joaquin Mazdak Luttinger and Walter Kohn), and of the Kane model (after Evan O. Kane).

== Background and derivation ==
=== Bloch's theorem and wavevectors ===
According to quantum mechanics (in the single-electron approximation), the quasi-free electrons in any solid are characterized by wavefunctions which are eigenstates of the following stationary Schrödinger equation:

$$\left(\frac{p^2}{2m}+V\right)\psi = E\psi$$

where p is the quantum-mechanical momentum operator, V is the potential, and m is the vacuum mass of the electron. (This equation neglects the spin–orbit effect; see below.)

In a crystalline solid, V is a periodic function, with the same periodicity as the crystal lattice. Bloch's theorem proves that the solutions to this differential equation can be written as follows:

$$\psi_{n,\mathbf{k}}(\mathbf{x}) = e^{i\mathbf{k}\cdot\mathbf{x}} u_{n,\mathbf{k}}(\mathbf{x})$$

where k is a vector (called the wavevector), n is a discrete index (called the band index), and u_{n,k} is a function with the same periodicity as the crystal lattice.

For any given n, the associated states are called a band. In each band, there will be a relation between the wavevector k and the energy of the state E_{n,k}, called the band dispersion. Calculating this dispersion is one of the primary applications of k·p perturbation theory.

=== Perturbation theory ===
The periodic function u_{n,k} satisfies the following Schrödinger-type equation (simply, a direct expansion of the Schrödinger equation with a Bloch-type wave function):

$$H_{\mathbf{k}} u_{n,\mathbf{k}}=E_{n,\mathbf{k}}u_{n,\mathbf{k}}$$

where the Hamiltonian is

$$H_{\mathbf{k}} = \frac{p^2}{2m} + \frac{\hbar \mathbf{k}\cdot\mathbf{p}}{m} + \frac{\hbar^2 k^2}{2m}  + V$$

Note that k is a vector consisting of three real numbers with dimensions of inverse length, while p is a vector of operators; to be explicit,

$$\mathbf{k}\cdot\mathbf{p} = k_x (-i\hbar \frac{\partial}{\partial x}) + k_y (-i\hbar \frac{\partial}{\partial y}) + k_z (-i\hbar \frac{\partial}{\partial z})$$

In any case, we write this Hamiltonian as the sum of two terms:

$$H_{\mathbf{k}}=H_0+H_{\mathbf{k}}', \;\; H_0 = \frac{p^2}{2m}+V, \;\; H_{\mathbf{k}}' = \frac{\hbar^2 k^2}{2m} + \frac{\hbar \mathbf{k}\cdot\mathbf{p}}{m}$$

This expression is the basis for perturbation theory. The "unperturbed Hamiltonian" is H_{0}, which in fact equals the exact Hamiltonian at k = 0 (i.e., at the gamma point). The "perturbation" is the term $H_{\mathbf{k}}'$. The analysis that results is called k·p perturbation theory, due to the term proportional to k·p. The result of this analysis is an expression for E_{n,k} and u_{n,k} in terms of the energies and wavefunctions at k = 0.

Note that the "perturbation" term $H_{\mathbf{k}}'$ gets progressively smaller as k approaches zero. Therefore, k·p perturbation theory is most accurate for small values of k. However, if enough terms are included in the perturbative expansion, then the theory can in fact be reasonably accurate for any value of k in the entire Brillouin zone.

=== Expression for a nondegenerate band ===
For a nondegenerate band (i.e., a band which has a different energy at k = 0 from any other band), with an extremum at k = 0, and with no spin–orbit coupling, the result of k·p perturbation theory is (to lowest nontrivial order):

$$u_{n,\mathbf{k}} = u_{n,0}+\frac{\hbar}{m}\sum_{n' \neq n}\frac{\langle u_{n',0} | \mathbf{k}\cdot\mathbf{p} | u_{n,0} \rangle}{E_{n,0}-E_{n',0}} u_{n',0}$$
$$E_{n,\mathbf{k}} = E_{n,0}+\frac{\hbar^2 k^2}{2m} + \frac{\hbar^2}{m^2} \sum_{n'\neq n} \frac{|\langle u_{n,0} | \mathbf{k}\cdot\mathbf{p} | u_{n',0} \rangle |^2}{E_{n,0}-E_{n',0}}$$

Since k is a vector of real numbers (rather than a vector of more complicated linear operators), the matrix element in these expressions can be rewritten as:

$$\langle u_{n,0} | \mathbf{k}\cdot\mathbf{p} | u_{n',0} \rangle = \mathbf{k} \cdot \langle u_{n,0} | \mathbf{p} | u_{n',0} \rangle$$

Therefore, one can calculate the energy at any k using only a few unknown parameters, namely E_{n,0} and $\langle u_{n,0} | \mathbf{p} | u_{n',0} \rangle$. The latter are called "optical matrix elements", closely related to transition dipole moments. These parameters are typically inferred from experimental data.

In practice, the sum over n often includes only the nearest one or two bands, since these tend to be the most important (due to the denominator). However, for improved accuracy, especially at larger k, more bands must be included, as well as more terms in the perturbative expansion than the ones written above.

==== Effective mass ====
Using the expression above for the energy dispersion relation, a simplified expression for the effective mass in the conduction band of a semiconductor can be found. To approximate the dispersion relation in the case of the conduction band, take the energy E_{n0} as the minimum conduction band energy E_{c0} and include in the summation only terms with energies near the valence band maximum, where the energy difference in the denominator is smallest. (These terms are the largest contributions to the summation.) This denominator is then approximated as the band gap E_{g}, leading to an energy expression:

$$E_c(\boldsymbol k ) \approx E_{c0} +\frac{(\hbar k)^2}{2m} +\frac{\hbar ^2}{{E_g}m^2}\sum_n  {|\langle u_{c,0}|\mathbf{k}\cdot\mathbf{p}| u_{n,0} \rangle |^2}$$

The effective mass in direction ℓ is then:

$$\frac{1} {{m}_{\ell}} = {{1} \over {\hbar^2}} \sum_{ m} \cdot {{\partial^{2} E_{c} (\boldsymbol{k})} \over {\partial k_{\ell} \partial k_ m}} \approx \frac{1}{m}+\frac{2}{E_gm^2}\sum_{m,\ n} {\langle u_{c,0}|p_{\ell}| u_{n,0} \rangle }{\langle u_{n,0}|p_{m}| u_{c,0} \rangle }$$

Ignoring the details of the matrix elements, the key consequences are that the effective mass varies with the smallest bandgap and goes to zero as the gap goes to zero. A useful approximation for the matrix elements in direct gap semiconductors is:

$$\frac{2}{E_gm^2}\sum_{m,\ n} {|\langle u_{c,0}|p_{\ell}| u_{n,0} \rangle |}{|\langle u_{c,0}|p_{m}| u_{n,0} \rangle |} \approx 20\mathrm{eV} \frac{1}{mE_{g}} \ ,$$

which applies within about 15% or better to most group-IV, III-V and II-VI semiconductors.

In contrast to this simple approximation, in the case of valence band energy the spin–orbit interaction must be introduced (see below) and many more bands must be individually considered. The calculation is provided in Yu and Cardona. In the valence band the mobile carriers are holes. One finds there are two types of hole, named heavy and light, with anisotropic masses.

=== k·p model with spin–orbit interaction ===
Including the spin–orbit interaction, the Schrödinger equation for u is:

$$H_{\mathbf{k}} u_{n,\mathbf{k}}=E_{n,\mathbf{k}}u_{n,\mathbf{k}}$$

where

$$H_{\mathbf{k}} = \frac{p^2}{2m} + \frac{\hbar}{m}\mathbf{k}\cdot\mathbf{p} + \frac{\hbar^2 k^2}{2m}  + V + \frac{\hbar}{4 m^2 c^2} (\nabla V \times (\mathbf{p}+\hbar\mathbf{k}))\cdot \vec \sigma$$

where $\vec \sigma=(\sigma_x,\sigma_y,\sigma_z)$ is a vector consisting of the three Pauli matrices. This Hamiltonian can be subjected to the same sort of perturbation-theory analysis as above.

=== Calculation in degenerate case ===
For degenerate or nearly degenerate bands, in particular the valence bands in certain materials such as gallium arsenide, the equations can be analyzed by the methods of degenerate perturbation theory. Models of this type include the "Luttinger–Kohn model" (a.k.a. "Kohn–Luttinger model"), and the "Kane model".

Generally, an effective Hamiltonian $H^{\rm{eff}}$ is introduced, and to the first order, its matrix elements can be expressed as

$$H^{\rm{eff}}_{\mathbf{k},mn}=\langle u_{m,0}|H_0|u_{n,0}\rangle + \mathbf{k}\cdot \langle u_{m,0}|\nabla _\mathbf{k} H_\mathbf{k}'|u_{n,0}\rangle$$

After solving it, the wave functions and energy bands are obtained.

== See also ==
Electronic band structure

- Electronic band structure
- Nearly free electron model
- Kronig–Penney model

Band properties

- Band gap
- Effective mass
- Density of states
- Fermi surface

Wavefunctions

- Wannier functions
- Bloch's theorem

Fundamental theory

- Kohn–Sham equations
- Local-density approximation
