= Rashba effect =

Momentum-dependent division of spin bands in two-dimensional condensed matter systems

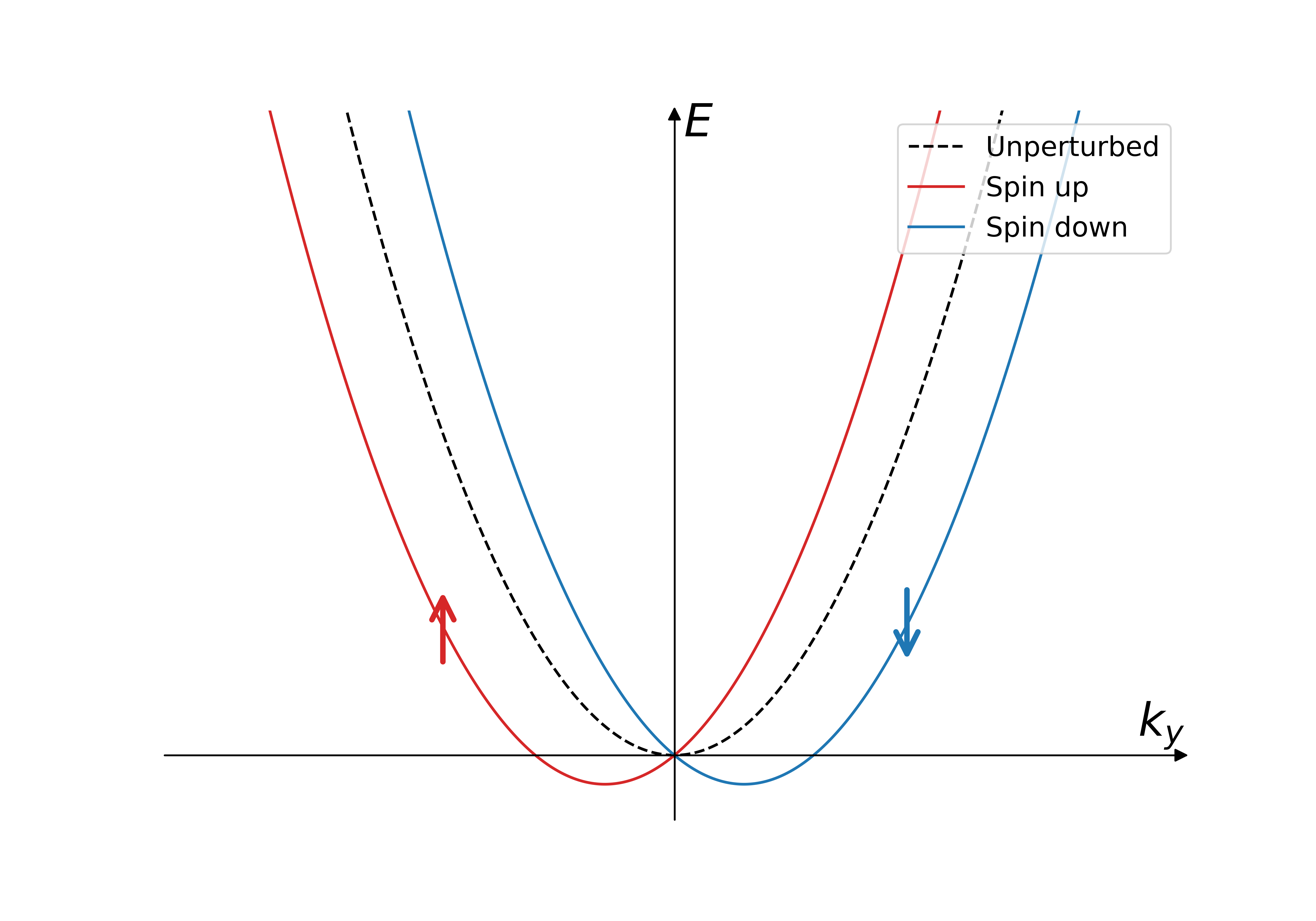
The spin-split dispersion relation that is the result of the Rashba effect, together with the unperturbed dispersion relation.

The Rashba effect, also called Bychkov–Rashba effect, is a momentum-dependent splitting of spin bands in bulk crystals (Note: More specifically, uniaxial noncentrosymmetric crystals.) and low-dimensional condensed matter systems (such as heterostructures and surface states). The splitting is a combined effect of spin–orbit interaction and asymmetry of the crystal potential, in particular in the direction perpendicular to the two-dimensional plane (as applied to surfaces and heterostructures).

The effect is named after Emmanuel Rashba, who discovered it with Valentin I. Sheka in 1959 for three-dimensional systems and afterward with Yurii A. Bychkov in 1984 for two-dimensional systems.

The Rashba effect drives a wide variety of physical phenomena, such as operating electron spins by electric fields, despite being only a small correction to the band structure of the two-dimensional metallic state. An example of a physical phenomenon that can be explained by Rashba model is the anisotropic magnetoresistance (AMR). (Note: AMR in most common magnetic materials was reviewed by McGuire & Potter 1975. A more recent work (Schliemann & Loss 2003) focused on the possibility of Rashba-effect-induced AMR and some extensions and corrections were given later (Trushin et al. 2009).) Additionally, superconductors with large Rashba splitting are suggested as possible realizations of the elusive Fulde–Ferrell–Larkin–Ovchinnikov (FFLO) state, Majorana fermions and topological p-wave superconductors. A momentum dependent pseudospin-orbit coupling has also been realized in cold atom systems.

== Hamiltonian ==
The Rashba effect is most easily seen in the simple model Hamiltonian known as the Rashba Hamiltonian

$$H_{\rm R}=\alpha(\hat{z}\times\mathbf{p})\cdot \boldsymbol{\sigma}$$,

where $\alpha$ is the Rashba coupling, $\mathbf p$ is the momentum and $\boldsymbol \sigma$ is the Pauli matrix vector. This is identical to the two-dimensional version of the Dirac Hamiltonian, but with a 90 degree rotation of the spins.

The Rashba model in solids can be derived in the framework of the k·p perturbation theory or from the point of view of a tight binding approximation.. Here we introduce a simple toy model to derive the Rashba coupling $\alpha$ qualitatively, followed by a sketch of a more accurate derivation.

== Naive derivation ==
The Rashba effect arises from the breaking of inversion symmetry in the direction perpendicular to a two-dimensional electron system. To illustrate this qualitatively, we add an electric field that breaks this symmetry:

$$\mathbf{E} = E_0 \hat{z}$$

Due to relativistic corrections, an electron moving with velocity $\mathbf{v}$ in an electric field $\mathbf{E}$ experiences an effective magnetic field in its rest frame, given by

$$\mathbf{B} = -\frac{\mathbf{v} \times \mathbf{E}}{c^2}$$

where $c$ is the speed of light. This magnetic field couples to the electron spin through the spin–orbit interaction as

$$H_{\mathrm{SO}} = \frac{g \mu_{\mathrm{B}}}{2 c^2} (\mathbf{v} \times \mathbf{E}) \cdot \boldsymbol{\sigma}$$

where $\boldsymbol{\sigma}$ are the Pauli matrices and $-g\mu_{\mathrm{B}}\boldsymbol{\sigma}/2$ represents the electron magnetic moment.

Within this simplified "toy" model, the resulting Rashba Hamiltonian can be written as

$$H_{\mathrm{R}} = \alpha_{\mathrm{R}} (\hat{z} \times \mathbf{p}) \cdot \boldsymbol{\sigma}$$

with a coupling strength

$$\alpha_{\mathrm{R}} = \frac{g \mu_{\mathrm{B}} E_0}{2 m c^2}.$$

This expression provides the correct functional form of the Rashba Hamiltonian but severely underestimates the coupling strength $\alpha_{\mathrm{R}}$. A more realistic description shows that the effect originates from interband coupling (band mixing) in the crystal. The "toy" model above uses the Dirac energy gap $m c^2$—on the order of MeV—as the denominator in the relativistic correction, which leads to an unrealistically small coupling. In actual materials, the relevant energy scales are the splittings between electronic bands, typically of order eV. This difference accounts for the much larger Rashba coupling observed experimentally.

Before continuing we make a comment about a common misconception regarding the Rashba effect. According to the Ehrenfest theorem, the average electric field experienced by an electron bound to a two-dimensional layer should vanish, because the expectation value of the force on a bound particle is zero. Applied naively, this reasoning seems to imply that the Rashba effect should not occur—an argument that led to early controversy prior to experimental confirmation. However, this interpretation is incomplete: the Rashba effect depends not on the *spatially averaged* electric field, but on the *local asymmetry* of the confining potential, which gives rise to an effective field acting on the electron spin.

== Estimation of the Rashba coupling in a realistic system – tight-binding approach ==
A microscopic estimate of the Rashba coupling constant $\alpha$ can be obtained using a tight-binding model. In many semiconductors, the itinerant carriers forming the two-dimensional electron gas (2DEG) originate from atomic s and p orbitals. For simplicity, consider holes in the $p_z$ band near the $\Gamma$ point.

Two ingredients are essential to obtain Rashba splitting: an atomic spin–orbit interaction

$$H_{\mathrm{SO}} = \Delta_{\mathrm{SO}}\, \mathbf{L} \cdot \boldsymbol{\sigma},$$

and an asymmetric potential in the direction perpendicular to the 2D plane,

$$H_E = e E_0 z.$$

The symmetry-breaking potential $H_E$ lifts the degeneracy between the out-of-plane $p_z$ orbital and the in-plane $p_x$ and $p_y$ orbitals, opening a gap $\Delta_{\mathrm{BG}}$. At the same time, it allows mixing (hybridization) between these orbitals, which can be described within a tight-binding approximation. The hopping amplitude from a $p_z$ state at site $i$ with spin $\sigma$ to a neighboring $p_{x,y}$ state at site $j$ with spin $\sigma'$ is

$$t_{ij;\sigma\sigma'}^{x,y} =
\langle p_z,i;\sigma \,|\, H \,|\, p_{x,y},j;\sigma' \rangle,$$

where $H$ is the full Hamiltonian. In the absence of inversion asymmetry ($H_E = 0$), this hopping vanishes by symmetry. When $H_E \neq 0$, the matrix element becomes finite; for nearest neighbors one can write approximately

$$t_{\sigma\sigma'}^{x,y} =
E_0 \langle p_z,i;\sigma \,|\, z \,|\, p_{x,y},i+\hat{x},\hat{y};\sigma' \rangle
= t_0\, \mathrm{sgn}(\hat{x},\hat{y}) \, \delta_{\sigma\sigma'},$$

where $\delta_{\sigma\sigma'}$ is the Kronecker delta.

The Rashba interaction can then be viewed as a second-order process: a hole hops from $|p_z,i;\uparrow\rangle$ to $|p_{x,y},i+\hat{x},\hat{y};\uparrow\rangle$ via $t_0$, then undergoes a spin flip through the atomic spin–orbit coupling $\Delta_{\mathrm{SO}}$, returning to $|p_z,i+\hat{x},\hat{y};\downarrow\rangle$. Overall, the carrier hops one lattice spacing while flipping its spin.

Treating this sequence as a second-order perturbation, the resulting Rashba coupling constant scales as

$$\alpha \approx \frac{a\, t_0\, \Delta_{\mathrm{SO}}}{\Delta_{\mathrm{BG}}},$$

where $a$ is the lattice spacing. Because the relevant energy denominators are of order eV rather than MeV (as in the naive relativistic model), this estimate yields a Rashba coupling several orders of magnitude larger, in agreement with experimental observations.

== Application ==
Spintronics - Electronic devices are based on the ability to manipulate the electrons position by means of electric fields. Similarly, devices can be based on the manipulation of the spin degree of freedom. The Rashba effect allows to manipulate the spin by the same means, that is, without the aid of a magnetic field. Such devices have many advantages over their electronic counterparts.

Topological quantum computation - Lately it has been suggested that the Rashba effect can be used to realize a p-wave superconductor. Such a superconductor has very special edge-states which are known as Majorana bound states. The non-locality immunizes them to local scattering and hence they are predicted to have long coherence times. Decoherence is one of the largest barriers on the way to realize a full scale quantum computer and these immune states are therefore considered good candidates for a quantum bit.

Discovery of the giant Rashba effect with $\alpha$ of about 5 eV•Å in bulk crystals such as BiTeI, ferroelectric GeTe, and in a number of low-dimensional systems bears a promise of creating devices operating electrons spins at nanoscale and possessing short operational times.

== Comparison with Dresselhaus spin–orbit coupling ==
The Rashba spin-orbit coupling is typical for systems with uniaxial symmetry, e.g., for hexagonal crystals of CdS and CdSe for which it was originally found and perovskites, and also for heterostructures where it develops as a result of a symmetry breaking field in the direction perpendicular to the 2D surface. All these systems lack inversion symmetry. A similar effect, known as the Dresselhaus spin orbit coupling arises in cubic crystals of A_{III}B_{V} type lacking inversion symmetry and in quantum wells manufactured from them.

== See also ==
- Electric dipole spin resonance
- Orbital Rashba effect
