= Surface states =

Electronic states at the surface of materials

Surface states are electronic states found at the surface of materials. They are formed due to the sharp transition from solid material that ends with a surface and are found only at the atom layers closest to the surface. The termination of a material with a surface leads to a change of the electronic band structure from the bulk material to the vacuum. In the weakened potential at the surface, new electronic states can be formed, so called surface states.

== Origin at condensed matter interfaces ==
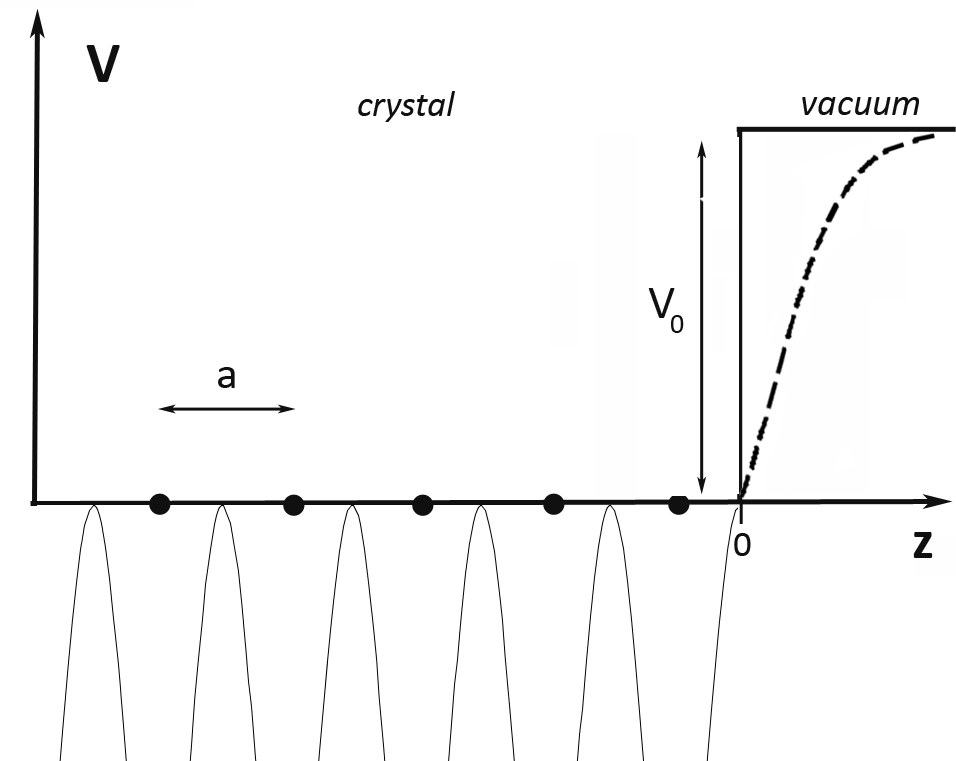
Figure 1. Simplified one-dimensional model of a periodic crystal potential terminating at an ideal surface. At the surface, the model potential jumps abruptly to the vacuum level (solid line). The dashed line represents a more realistic picture, where the potential reaches the vacuum level over some distance.

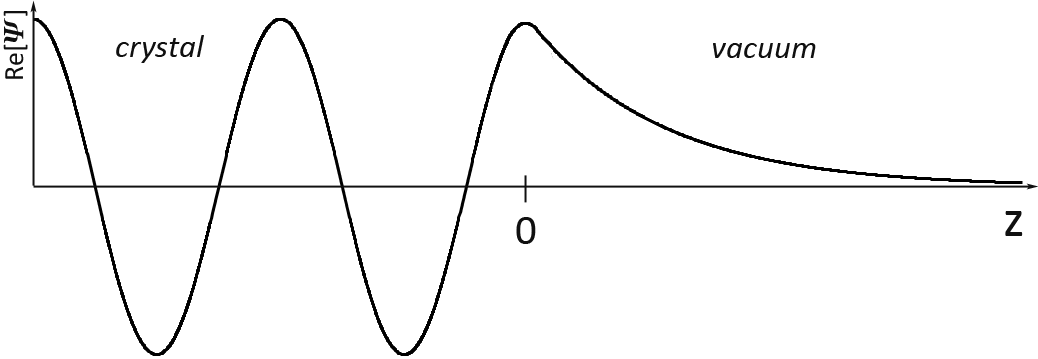
Figure 2. Real part of the type of solution to the one-dimensional Schrödinger equation that corresponds to the bulk states. These states have Bloch character in the bulk, while decaying exponentially into the vacuum.

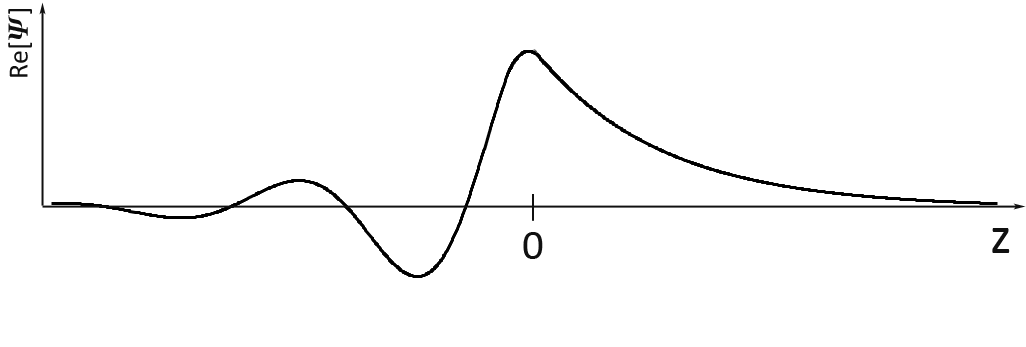
Figure 3. Real part of the type of solution to the one-dimensional Schrödinger equation that corresponds to surface states. These states decay into both the vacuum and the bulk crystal and thus represent states localized at the crystal surface.

As stated by Bloch's theorem, eigenstates of the single-electron Schrödinger equation with a perfectly periodic potential, a crystal, are Bloch waves

$$\begin{align}
\Psi_{n\boldsymbol{k}} &=\mathrm{e}^{i\boldsymbol{k}\cdot\boldsymbol{r}}u_{n\boldsymbol{k}}(\boldsymbol{r}).
\end{align}$$

Here $u_{n\boldsymbol{k}}(\boldsymbol{r})$ is a function with the same periodicity as the crystal, n is the band index and k is the wave number. The allowed wave numbers for a given potential are found by applying the usual Born–von Karman cyclic boundary conditions. The termination of a crystal, i.e. the formation of a surface, obviously causes deviation from perfect periodicity. Consequently, if the cyclic boundary conditions are abandoned in the direction normal to the surface the behavior of electrons will deviate from the behavior in the bulk and some modifications of the electronic structure has to be expected.

A simplified model of the crystal potential in one dimension can be sketched as shown in Figure 1. In the crystal, the potential has the periodicity, a, of the lattice while close to the surface it has to somehow attain the value of the vacuum level. The step potential (solid line) shown in Figure 1 is an oversimplification which is mostly convenient for simple model calculations. At a real surface the potential is influenced by image charges and the formation of surface dipoles and it rather looks as indicated by the dashed line.

Given the potential in Figure 1, it can be shown that the one-dimensional single-electron Schrödinger equation gives two qualitatively different types of solutions.

- The first type of states (see figure 2) extends into the crystal and has Bloch character there. These types of solutions correspond to bulk states which terminate in an exponentially decaying tail reaching into the vacuum.
- The second type of states (see figure 3) decays exponentially both into the vacuum and the bulk crystal. These types of solutions correspond to surface states with wave functions localized close to the crystal surface.

The first type of solution can be obtained for both metals and semiconductors. In semiconductors though, the associated eigenenergies have to belong to one of the allowed energy bands. The second type of solution exists in forbidden energy gap of semiconductors as well as in local gaps of the projected band structure of metals. It can be shown that the energies of these states all lie within the band gap. As a consequence, in the crystal these states are characterized by an imaginary wavenumber leading to an exponential decay into the bulk.

=== Shockley states and Tamm states ===
In the discussion of surface states, one generally distinguishes between Shockley states and Tamm states, named after the American physicist William Shockley and the Russian physicist Igor Tamm. There is no strict physical distinction between the two types of states, but the qualitative character and the mathematical approach used in describing them is different.

- Historically, surface states that arise as solutions to the Schrödinger equation in the framework of the nearly free electron approximation for clean and ideal surfaces, are called Shockley states. Shockley states are thus states that arise due to the change in the electron potential associated solely with the crystal termination. This approach is suited to describe normal metals and some narrow gap semiconductors. Figure 3 shows an example of a Shockley state, derived using the nearly free electron approximation. Within the crystal, Shockley states resemble exponentially-decaying Bloch waves.
- Surface states that are calculated in the framework of a tight-binding model are often called Tamm states. In the tight binding approach, the electronic wave functions are usually expressed as linear combinations of atomic orbitals (LCAO). In contrast to the nearly free electron model used to describe the Shockley states, the Tamm states are suitable to describe also transition metals and wide gap semiconductors. Qualitatively, Tamm states resemble localized atomic or molecular orbitals at the surface.

=== Topological surface states ===
All materials can be classified by a single number, a topological invariant; this is constructed out of the bulk electronic wave functions, which are integrated in over the Brillouin zone, in a similar way that the genus is calculated in geometric topology. In certain materials the topological invariant can be changed when certain bulk energy bands invert due to strong spin-orbital coupling. At the interface between an insulator with non-trivial topology, a so-called topological insulator, and one with a trivial topology, the interface must become metallic. More over, the surface state must have linear Dirac-like dispersion with a crossing point which is protected by time reversal symmetry. Such a state is predicted to be robust under disorder, and therefore cannot be easily localized.

== Shockley states ==
=== Surface states in metals ===
A simple model for the derivation of the basic properties of states at a metal surface is a semi-infinite periodic chain of identical atoms. In this model, the termination of the chain represents the surface, where the potential attains the value V_{0} of the vacuum in the form of a step function, figure 1. Within the crystal the potential is assumed periodic with the periodicity a of the lattice. The Shockley states are then found as solutions to the one-dimensional single electron Schrödinger equation

$$\begin{align}
\left[-\frac{\hbar^2}{2m}\frac{d^2}{dz^2}+V(z)\right]\Psi(z) &=& E\Psi(z),
\end{align}$$

with the periodic potential

$$\begin{align}
V(z)=\left\{
\begin{array}{cc}
P\delta(z+la),& \textrm{for}\quad z<0 \\
V_0,&\textrm{for} \quad z>0
\end{array}\right.,
\end{align}$$

where l is an integer, and P is the normalization factor. The solution must be obtained independently for the two domains z<0 and z>0, where at the domain boundary (z=0) the usual conditions on continuity of the wave function and its derivatives are applied. Since the potential is periodic deep inside the crystal, the electronic wave functions must be Bloch waves here. The solution in the crystal is then a linear combination of an incoming wave and a wave reflected from the surface. For z>0 the solution will be required to decrease exponentially into the vacuum

$$\begin{align}
\Psi(z) &=& \left\{
\begin{array}{cc}
Bu_{-k}e^{-ikz}+Cu_{k}e^{ikz},&\textrm{for} \quad z<0\\
A\exp\left[-\sqrt{2m(V_0-E)}\frac{z}{\hbar}\right],& \textrm{for}\quad z>0
\end{array}\right.,
\end{align}$$

The wave function for a state at a metal surface is qualitatively shown in figure 2. It is an extended Bloch wave within the crystal with an exponentially decaying tail outside the surface. The consequence of the tail is a deficiency of negative charge density just inside the crystal and an increased negative charge density just outside the surface, leading to the formation of a dipole double layer. The dipole perturbs the potential at the surface leading, for example, to a change of the metal work function.

=== Surface states in semiconductors ===
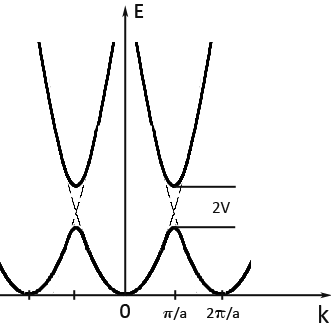
Figure 4. Electronic band structure in the nearly free electron picture. Away from the Brillouin zone boundary the electron wave function has plane wave character and the dispersion relation is parabolic. At the Brillouin zone boundary the wave function is a standing wave composed of an incoming and a Bragg-reflected wave. This ultimately leads to the creation of a band gap.

The nearly free electron approximation can be used to derive the basic properties of surface states for narrow gap semiconductors. The semi-infinite linear chain model is also useful in this case. However, now the potential along the atomic chain is assumed to vary as a cosine function

$$\begin{alignat}{2}
V(z)&= V\left[\exp\left(i\frac{2\pi z}{a}\right)+\exp\left(-i\frac{2\pi z}{a}\right)\right] \\
&=2 V\cos\left(\frac{2\pi z}{a}\right), \\
\end{alignat}$$

whereas at the surface the potential is modeled as a step function of height V_{0}. The solutions to the Schrödinger equation must be obtained separately for the two domains z < 0 and z > 0. In the sense of the nearly free electron approximation, the solutions obtained for z < 0 will have plane wave character for wave vectors away from the Brillouin zone boundary $k=\pm\pi/a$, where the dispersion relation will be parabolic, as shown in figure 4. At the Brillouin zone boundaries, Bragg reflection occurs resulting in a standing wave consisting of a wave with wave vector $k = \pi/a$ and wave vector $k=-\pi/a$.

$$\begin{align}
\Psi(z) &= Ae^{ik z}+ Be^{i[k -(2\pi/a) ]z}.
\end{align}$$

Here $G=2\pi/a$ is a lattice vector of the reciprocal lattice (see figure 4). Since the solutions of interest are close to the Brillouin zone boundary, we set $k_\perp=\bigl(\pi/a\bigr)+\kappa$, where κ is a small quantity. The arbitrary constants A,B are found by substitution into the Schrödinger equation. This leads to the following eigenvalues

$$\begin{align}
E &= \frac{\hbar^2}{2m}\left(\frac{\pi}{a}+\kappa\right)^2\pm |V|\left[-\frac{\hbar^2 \pi \kappa}{m a |V|}\pm \sqrt{\left(\frac{\hbar^2 \pi \kappa}{ma |V|}\right)^2+1}\right]
\end{align}$$

demonstrating the band splitting at the edges of the Brillouin zone, where the width of the forbidden gap is given by 2V. The electronic wave functions deep inside the crystal, attributed to the different bands are given by

$$\begin{align}
\Psi_i &= Ce^{i\kappa z} \left(
e^{i\pi z/a} + \left[-\frac{\hbar^2 \pi \kappa}{m a |V|}\pm \sqrt{\left(\frac{\hbar^2 \pi \kappa}{ma |V|}\right)^2+1}\right]e^{-i\pi z/a}\right)
\end{align}$$

Where C is a normalization constant. Near the surface at z = 0, the bulk solution has to be fitted to an exponentially decaying solution, which is compatible with the constant potential V_{0}.

$$\begin{align}
\Psi_0 &= D\exp\left[-\sqrt{\frac{2m}{\hbar^2}(V_0-E)}z\right]
\end{align}$$

It can be shown that the matching conditions can be fulfilled for every possible energy eigenvalue which lies in the allowed band. As in the case for metals, this type of solution represents standing Bloch waves extending into the crystal which spill over into the vacuum at the surface. A qualitative plot of the wave function is shown in figure 2.

If imaginary values of κ are considered, i.e. κ = - i·q for z ≤ 0 and one defines

$$\begin{align}
i \sin(2\delta) &= -i\frac{\hbar^2 \pi q}{maV}
\end{align}$$

one obtains solutions with a decaying amplitude into the crystal

$$\begin{align}
\Psi_i(z\leq0) &= Fe^{qz}\left[\exp\left[i\left(\frac{\pi}{a}z\pm\delta\right)\right]\pm\exp\left[-i\left(\frac{\pi}{a}z\pm\delta\right)\right]\right]e^{\mp i\delta}
\end{align}$$

The energy eigenvalues are given by

$$\begin{align}
E &= \frac{\hbar^2}{2m}\left[\left(\frac{\pi}{a}\right)^2-q^2\right]\pm V\sqrt{1-\left(\frac{\hbar^2\pi q}{maV}\right)^2}
\end{align}$$

E is real for large negative z, as required. Also in the range $0\leq q\leq q_{max}=\frac{m a V} {\hbar^2 \pi}$ all energies of the surface states fall into the forbidden gap. The complete solution is again found by matching the bulk solution to the exponentially decaying vacuum solution. The result is a state localized at the surface decaying both into the crystal and the vacuum. A qualitative plot is shown in figure 3.

=== Surface states of a three-dimensional crystal ===
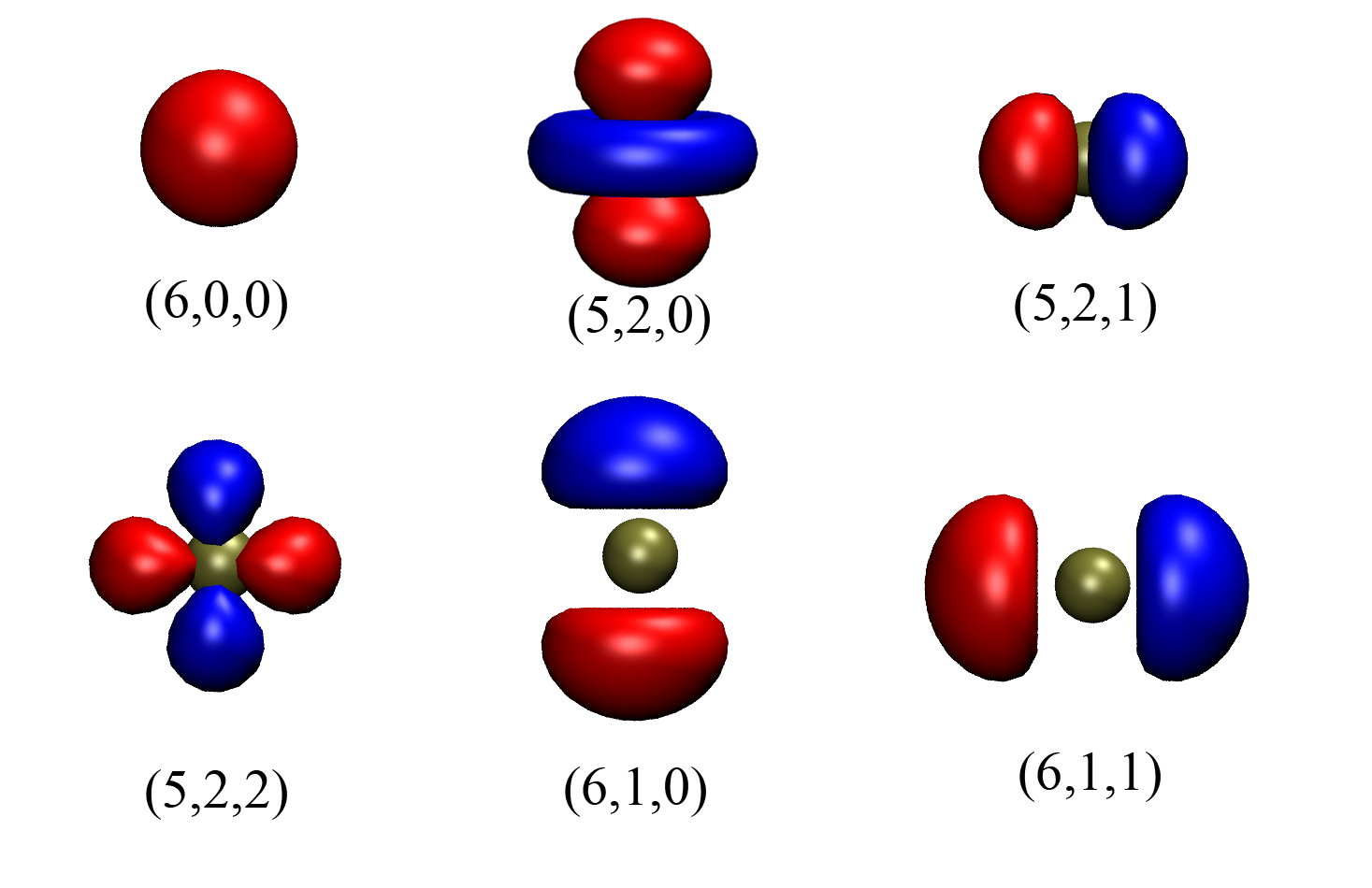
Figure 5. Atomic like orbitals of a Pt-atom. The orbitals shown are part of the double-zeta basis set used in density functional calculations. The orbitals are indexed according to the usual quantum numbers (n,l,m).

The results for surface states of a monatomic linear chain can readily be generalized to the case of a three-dimensional crystal. Because of the two-dimensional periodicity of the surface lattice, Bloch's theorem must hold for translations parallel to the surface. As a result, the surface states can be written as the product of a Bloch waves with k-values $\textbf{k}_{||}=(k_x,k_y)$ parallel to the surface and a function representing a one-dimensional surface state

$$\begin{align}
\Psi_0(\textbf{r}) &=& \psi_0(z)u_{\textbf{k}_{||}}(\textbf{r}_{||})e^{-i\textbf{r}_{||}\cdot\textbf{k}_{||}}
\end{align}$$

The energy of this state is increased by a term $E_{||}$ so that we have

$$\begin{align}
E_s = E_0 + \frac{\hbar^2\textbf{k}^2_{||}}{2m^*},
\end{align}$$

where m^{*} is the effective mass of the electron. The matching conditions at the crystal surface, i.e. at z=0, have to be satisfied for each $\textbf{k}_{||}$ separately and for each $\textbf{k}_{||}$ a single, but generally different energy level for the surface state is obtained.

=== True surface states and surface resonances ===
A surface state is described by the energy $E_s$ and its wave vector $\textbf{k}_{||}$ parallel to the surface, while a bulk state is characterized by both $\mathbf{k}_{||}$ and $\mathbf{k}_\perp$ wave numbers. In the two-dimensional Brillouin zone of the surface, for each value of $\mathbf{k}_{||}$ therefore a rod of $\mathbf{k}_\perp$ is extending into the three-dimensional Brillouin zone of the Bulk. Bulk energy bands that are being cut by these rods allow states that penetrate deep into the crystal. One therefore generally distinguishes between true surface states and surface resonances. True surface states are characterized by energy bands that are not degenerate with bulk energy bands. These states exist in the forbidden energy gap only and are therefore localized at the surface, similar to the picture given in figure 3. At energies where a surface and a bulk state are degenerate, the surface and the bulk state can mix, forming a surface resonance. Such a state can propagate deep into the bulk, similar to Bloch waves, while retaining an enhanced amplitude close to the surface.

== Tamm states ==
Surface states that are calculated in the framework of a tight-binding model are often called Tamm states. In the tight binding approach, the electronic wave functions are usually expressed as a linear combination of atomic orbitals (LCAO), see figure 5. In this picture, it is easy to comprehend that the existence of a surface will give rise to surface states with energies different from the energies of the bulk states: Since the atoms residing in the topmost surface layer are missing their bonding partners on one side, their orbitals have less overlap with the orbitals of neighboring atoms. The splitting and shifting of energy levels of the atoms forming the crystal is therefore smaller at the surface than in the bulk.

If a particular orbital is responsible for the chemical bonding, e.g. the sp^{3} hybrid in Si or Ge, it is strongly affected by the presence of the surface, bonds are broken, and the remaining lobes of the orbital stick out from the surface. They are called dangling bonds. The energy levels of such states are expected to significantly shift from the bulk values.

In contrast to the nearly free electron model used to describe the Shockley states, the Tamm states are suitable to describe also transition metals and wide-bandgap semiconductors.

== Extrinsic surface states ==
Surface states originating from clean and well ordered surfaces are usually called intrinsic. These states include states originating from reconstructed surfaces, where the two-dimensional translational symmetry gives rise to the band structure in the k space of the surface.

Extrinsic surface states are usually defined as states not originating from a clean and well ordered surface. Surfaces that fit into the category extrinsic are:

1. Surfaces with defects, where the translational symmetry of the surface is broken.
2. Surfaces with adsorbates
3. Interfaces between two materials, such as a semiconductor-oxide or semiconductor-metal interface
4. Interfaces between solid and liquid phases.

Generally, extrinsic surface states cannot easily be characterized in terms of their chemical, physical or structural properties.

== Experimental observation ==
=== Angle resolved photoemission spectroscopy ===
An experimental technique to measure the dispersion of surface states is angle resolved photoemission spectroscopy (ARPES) or angle resolved ultraviolet photoelectron spectroscopy (ARUPS).

=== Scanning tunneling microscopy ===
The surface state dispersion can be measured using a scanning tunneling microscope; in these experiments, periodic modulations in the surface state density, which arise from scattering off of surface impurities or step edges, are measured by an STM tip at a given bias voltage. The wavevector versus bias (energy) of the surface state electrons can be fit to a free-electron model with effective mass and surface state onset energy.

== A recent new theory ==
A naturally simple but fundamental question is how many surface states are in a band gap in a one-dimensional crystal of length $N a$ ($a$ is the potential period, and $N$ is a positive integer)? A well-accepted concept proposed by Fowler first in 1933, then written in Seitz's classic book that "in a finite one-dimensional crystal the surface states occur in pairs, one state being associated with each end of the crystal." Such a concept seemly was never doubted since then for nearly a century, as shown, for example, in. However, a recent new investigation gives an entirely different answer.

The investigation tries to understand electronic states in ideal crystals of finite size based on the mathematical theory of periodic differential equations. This theory provides some fundamental new understandings of those electronic states, including surface states.

The theory found that a one-dimensional finite crystal with two ends at $\tau$ and $N a + \tau$ always has one and only one state whose energy and properties depend on $\tau$ but not $N$ for each band gap. This state is either a band-edge state or a surface state in the band gap(see, Particle in a one-dimensional lattice, Particle in a box). Numerical calculations have confirmed such findings. Further, these behaviors have been seen in different one-dimensional systems, such as in.

Therefore:

- The fundamental property of a surface state is that its existence and properties depend on the location of the periodicity truncation.
- Truncation of the lattice's periodic potential may or may not lead to a surface state in a band gap.
- An ideal one-dimensional crystal of finite length $L = N a$ with two ends can have, at most, only one surface state at one end in each band gap.

Further investigations extended to multi-dimensional cases found that

- An ideal simple three-dimensional finite crystal may have vertex-like, edge-like, surface-like, and bulk-like states.
- A surface state is always in a band gap is only valid for one-dimensional cases.
