= Free electron =

Free electron in physics may refer to:

- Electron, as a free particle
- Solvated electron
- Charge carrier, as carriers of electric charge
- Valence electron, as an outer shell electron that is associated with an atom
- Valence and conduction bands, as a conduction band electron relative to the electronic band structure of a solid
- Fermi gas, as a particle of a non-interacting electron gas
- Free electron model, as a particle in the Drude-Sommerfeld model of metals
- Free-electron laser, as a particle in the electron beam

== See also ==
- Independent electron approximation
- Lone pair or free electron pair
- Nearly free electron model
- Orbital angular momentum of free electrons
- Unpaired electron
