= Surface differential reflectivity =

Spectroscopic technique

Surface differential reflectivity (SDR) or differential reflectance spectroscopy (DRS) is a spectroscopic technique that measures and compares the reflectivity of a sample in two different physical conditions (modulation spectroscopy). The result is presented in terms of ΔR/R, which is defined as follows:

$\frac{\Delta R}{R}=\frac{R_1 - R_2}{R_2}$

where R_{1} and R_{2} represent the reflectivity due to a particular state or condition of the sample.

The differential reflectivity is used to enhance just the contributions to the reflected signal coming from the sample. In fact, the light penetration (α^{−1}) inside a solid is related to the adsorption coefficient (α) of the material. The contribution of the sample surface (e.g., surface states, ultra-thin and thin deposited films, etc.) to the reflected signal is generally evaluated in the 10^{−2} range. The difference between two sample states (1 and 2) is thought to put in evidence small changes occurring onto the sample surface. If R_{1} represents a clean freshly prepared surface (e.g., after a cleavage in vacuum) and R_{2} the same sample after the exposure to hydrogen or oxygen contaminants, the ΔR/R spectrum can be related to features of the clean surface (e.g., surface states); if R_{1} is the reflectivity spectrum of a sample covered by an organic film (even if the substrate is only partially covered) and R_{2} represents the optical spectrum of the pristine substrate, the ΔR/R spectrum can be related to the optical properties of the deposited molecules; etc.

The experimental SDR definition reported was interpreted in terms of surface (or film) thickness (d) and its dielectric function (ε_{2} = ε'_{2} - iε"_{2}). This model, which assumes the surface as a well-defined phase above a bulk, is known as the "three-layer model" and states that:

$\frac{\Delta R}{R}=8\pi\frac{d}{\lambda}Im\frac{\epsilon_1 - \epsilon_2}{\epsilon_1 - \epsilon_3}$

where ε_{1} = 1 is the vacuum dielectric constant and ε_{3} = ε'_{3} - iε"_{3} is the bulk dielectric function.

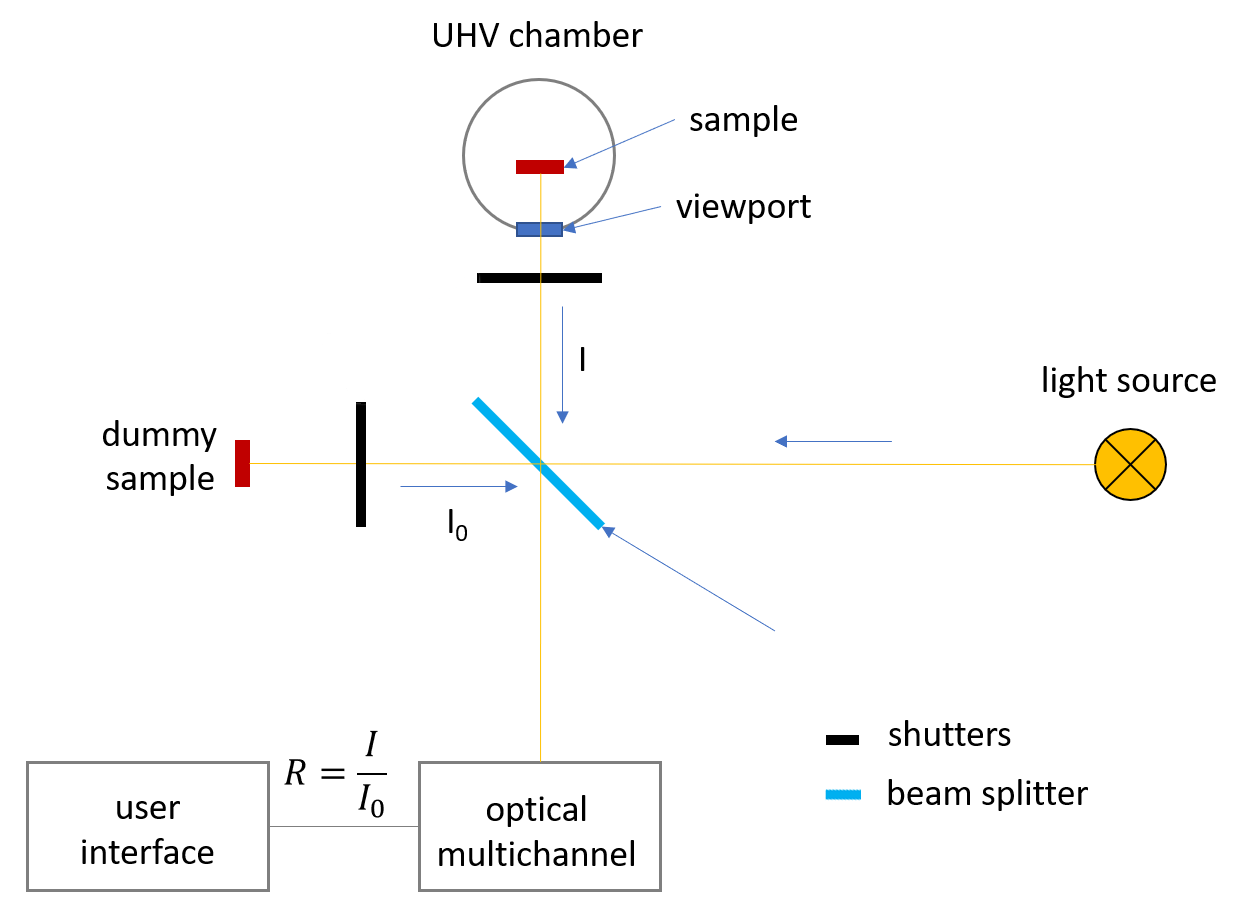
Sketch of an SDR optical appratus.

The SDR measurements are generally realized by exploiting an optical multichannel system coupled with a double optical path in the so-called Michelson-cross configuration.

In this configuration, the ΔR/R signal is obtained by a direct comparison between the reflectivity signal R_{1} arises from the sample (e.g., a silicon substrate covered by a few amount of molecules) placed inside the UHV chamber (first optical path) and the R_{2} signal acquired from a reference sample (dummy sample; e.g., a silicon wafer) placed along the second optical path. The difference between R_{1} and R_{2} is due to the deposited molecules, which can affect the reflectivity signal in the 10^{−3}÷10^{−2} range of the overall reflected signal of the real sample. Consequently, a high signal stability is required and the two optical paths must be as comparable as possible.

The SDR apparatus was firstly described and used by G. Chiarotti for the investigation of the surface states contribution in the Ge(111) reflectivity properties. This work also represents the first direct evidence of the existence of surface states in semiconductors. An evolution of the SDR set-up by using linearly polarized light was firstly described by P. Chiaradia and co-workers for testing the structure of the Si(111) 2 × 1 surface. Other equivalent SDR set-up have been exploited for studying: the surface roughening evolution, the reactivity of halogens with semiconductor surfaces, the adhesion of nanoparticles during their growth, the growth of heavy metals on semiconductors, the nano-antennas characterization, just to mention some of the works related to this surface optical technique.
