= IBZ =

IBZ may refer to:

- Ibiza Airport
- International Bibliography of Periodical Literature (Internationale Bibliographie der Zeitschriftenliteratur)
- Irreducible Brillouin zone
