= K-vector =

In mathematics and physics, k-vector may refer to:

- A wave vector k
- Crystal momentum
- A multivector of grade k, also called a k-vector, the dual of a differential k-form
- An element of a k-dimensional vector space, especially a four-vector used in relativity to mean a quantity related to four-dimensional spacetime
