= Nearly free electron model =

Physical model of solid metals as electron gases

In solid-state physics, the nearly free electron model (or NFE model and quasi-free electron model) is a quantum mechanical model of physical properties of electrons that can move almost freely through the crystal lattice of a solid. The model is closely related to the more conceptual empty lattice approximation. The model enables understanding and calculation of the electronic band structures, especially of metals.

This model is an immediate improvement of the free electron model, in which the metal was considered as a non-interacting electron gas and the ions were neglected completely.

== Mathematical formulation ==
Dispersion relation for the 2D nearly free electron model as a function of the underlying crystalline structure.

The nearly free electron model is a modification of the free-electron gas model which includes a weak periodic perturbation meant to model the interaction between the conduction electrons and the ions in a crystalline solid. This model, like the free-electron model, does not take into account electron–electron interactions; that is, the independent electron approximation is still in effect.

As shown by Bloch's theorem, introducing a periodic potential into the Schrödinger equation results in a wave function of the form

$$\psi_{\mathbf{k}}(\mathbf{r}) = u_{\mathbf{k}}(\mathbf{r}) e^{i\mathbf{k}\cdot\mathbf{r}}$$

where the function $u_\mathbf{k}$ has the same periodicity as the lattice:

$$u_{\mathbf{k}}(\mathbf{r}) = u_{\mathbf{k}}(\mathbf{r}+\mathbf{T})$$

(where $T$ is a lattice translation vector.)

Because it is a nearly free electron approximation we can assume that

$$u_{\mathbf{k}}(\mathbf{r}) \approx \frac{1}{\sqrt{\Omega_r}}$$
where $\Omega_r$ denotes the volume of states of fixed radius $r$ (as described in Gibbs paradox).

A solution of this form can be plugged into the Schrödinger equation, resulting in the central equation:

$$(\lambda_{\mathbf{k}} - \varepsilon)C_{\mathbf{k}} + \sum_{\mathbf{G}} U_{\mathbf{G}} C_{\mathbf{k}-\mathbf{G}}=0$$

where $\varepsilon$ is the total energy, and the kinetic energy $\lambda_{\mathbf{k}}$ is characterized by

$$\lambda_{\mathbf{k}}\psi_{\mathbf{k}}(\mathbf{r}) = -\frac{\hbar^2}{2m}\nabla^2 \psi_{\mathbf{k}}(\mathbf{r}) = -\frac{\hbar^2}{2m}\nabla^2 (u_{\mathbf{k}}(\mathbf{r}) e^{i\mathbf{k}\cdot\mathbf{r}})$$

which, after dividing by $\psi_{\mathbf{k}}(\mathbf{r})$, reduces to

$$\lambda_{\mathbf{k}} = \frac{\hbar^2 k^2}{2m}$$

if we assume that $u_{\mathbf{k}}(\mathbf{r})$ is almost constant and $\nabla^2 u_{\mathbf{k}}(\mathbf{r}) \ll k^2.$

The reciprocal parameters $C_\mathbf{k}$ and $U_\mathbf{G}$ are the Fourier coefficients of the wave function $\psi(\mathbf{r})$ and the screened potential energy $U(\mathbf{r})$, respectively:

$$U(\mathbf{r}) = \sum_{\mathbf{G}} U_{\mathbf{G}} e^{i\mathbf{G}\cdot\mathbf{r}}$$
$$\psi(\mathbf{r}) = \sum_{\mathbf{k}} C_{\mathbf{k}} e^{i\mathbf{k}\cdot\mathbf{r}}$$

The vectors $\mathbf{G}$ are the reciprocal lattice vectors, and the discrete values of $\mathbf{k}$ are determined by the boundary conditions of the lattice under consideration.

Before doing the perturbation analysis, let us first consider the base case to which the perturbation is applied. Here, the base case is $U(x) = 0$, and therefore all the Fourier coefficients of the potential are also zero. In this case the central equation reduces to the form

$$(\lambda_{\mathbf{k}} - \varepsilon)C_{\mathbf{k}} = 0$$

This identity means that for each $\mathbf{k}$, one of the two following cases must hold:

1. $C_{\mathbf{k}} = 0$,
2. $\lambda_{\mathbf{k}} = \varepsilon$

If $\varepsilon$ is a non-degenerate energy level, then the second case occurs for only one value of $\mathbf{k}$, while for the remaining $\mathbf{k}$, the Fourier expansion coefficient $C_{\mathbf{k}}$ is zero. In this case, the standard free electron gas result is retrieved:

$$\psi_{\mathbf{k}} \propto e^{i\mathbf{k}\cdot\mathbf{r}}$$

If $\varepsilon$ is a degenerate energy level, there will be a set of lattice vectors $\mathbf{k}_1, \dots, \mathbf{k}_m$ with $\lambda_1 = \dots = \lambda_m = \varepsilon$. Then there will be $m$ independent plane wave solutions of which any linear combination is also a solution:

$$\psi \propto \sum_{j=1}^{m} A_j e^{i\mathbf{k}_j\cdot\mathbf{r}}$$

Now let $U$ be nonzero and small. Non-degenerate and degenerate perturbation theory, respectively, can be applied in these two cases to solve for the Fourier coefficients $C_\mathbf{k}$ of the wavefunction (correct to first order in $U$) and the energy eigenvalue $\varepsilon$ (correct to second order in $U$). An important result of this derivation is that there is no first-order shift in the energy $\varepsilon$ in the case of no degeneracy, while there is in the case of degeneracy (and near-degeneracy), implying that the latter case is more important in this analysis. Particularly, at the Brillouin zone boundary (or, equivalently, at any point on a Bragg plane), one finds a twofold energy degeneracy that results in a shift in energy given by:

$$\varepsilon = \lambda_{\mathbf{k}} \pm |U_{\mathbf{G}}|.$$

This energy gap between Brillouin zones is known as the band gap, with a magnitude of $2|U_\mathbf{G}|$.

== Results ==
Introducing this weak perturbation has significant effects on the solution to the Schrödinger equation, most significantly resulting in a band gap between wave vectors in different Brillouin zones.

== Justifications ==
In this model, the assumption is made that the interaction between the conduction electrons and the ion cores can be modeled through the use of a "weak" perturbing potential. This may seem like a severe approximation, for the Coulomb attraction between these two particles of opposite charge can be quite significant at short distances. It can be partially justified, however, by noting two important properties of the quantum mechanical system:

1. The force between the ions and the electrons is greatest at very small distances. However, the conduction electrons are not "allowed" to get this close to the ion cores due to the Pauli exclusion principle: the orbitals closest to the ion core are already occupied by the core electrons. Therefore, the conduction electrons never get close enough to the ion cores to feel their full force.
2. Furthermore, the core electrons shield the ion charge magnitude "seen" by the conduction electrons. The result is an effective nuclear charge experienced by the conduction electrons which is significantly reduced from the actual nuclear charge.

== See also ==
- Empty lattice approximation
- Electronic band structure
- Tight binding model
- Bloch's theorem
- Kronig–Penney model
