= Crystal momentum =

Quantum-mechanical vector property in solid-state physics

There are an infinite number of sinusoidal oscillations that perfectly fit a set of discrete oscillators, making it impossible to define a k-vector unequivocally. This is a relation of inter-oscillator distances to the spatial Nyquist frequency of waves in the lattice. See also Aliasing § Sampling sinusoidal functions for more on the equivalence of k-vectors.

In solid-state physics, crystal momentum or quasimomentum is a momentum-like vector associated with electrons in a crystal lattice. It is defined by the associated wave vectors $\mathbf{k}$ of this lattice, according to
$$\mathbf{p}_{\text{crystal}} \equiv \hbar \mathbf{k}$$
(where $\hbar$ is the reduced Planck constant). In systems with discrete translation symmetry, crystal momentum is conserved like mechanical momentum, making it useful to physicists and materials scientists as an analytical tool.

== Lattice symmetry origins ==
A common method of modeling crystal structure and behavior is to view electrons as quantum mechanical particles traveling through a fixed infinite periodic potential $V(x)$ such that
$$V(\mathbf{x} + \mathbf{a}) = V(\mathbf{x}),$$
where $\mathbf{a}$ is an arbitrary lattice vector. Such a model is sensible because crystal ions that form the lattice structure are typically on the order of tens of thousands of times more massive than electrons, making it safe to replace them with a fixed potential structure, and the macroscopic dimensions of a crystal are typically far greater than a single lattice spacing, making edge effects negligible. A consequence of this potential energy function is that it is possible to shift the initial position of an electron by any lattice vector $\mathbf{a}$ without changing any aspect of the problem, thereby defining a discrete symmetry. Technically, an infinite periodic potential implies that the lattice translation operator $T(a)$ commutes with the Hamiltonian, assuming a simple kinetic-plus-potential form.

These conditions imply Bloch's theorem, which states
$$\psi_n(\mathbf{x}) = e^{i \mathbf{k} \cdot \mathbf{x}} u_{n\mathbf{k}}(\mathbf{x}), \qquad
u_{n\mathbf{k}}(\mathbf{x} + \mathbf{a}) = u_{n\mathbf{k}}(\mathbf{x}),$$
or that an electron in a lattice, which can be modeled as a single particle wave function $\psi(\mathbf{x})$, finds its stationary state solutions in the form of a plane wave multiplied by a periodic function $u(\mathbf{x})$. The theorem arises as a direct consequence of the aforementioned fact that the lattice symmetry translation operator commutes with the system's Hamiltonian.

One of the notable aspects of Bloch's theorem is that it shows directly that steady state solutions may be identified with a wave vector $\mathbf{k}$, meaning that this quantum number remains a constant of motion. Crystal momentum is then conventionally defined by multiplying this wave vector by the Planck constant:
$$\mathbf{p}_{\text{crystal}} = \hbar \mathbf{k}.$$

While this is in fact identical to the definition one might give for regular momentum (for example, by treating the effects of the translation operator by the effects of a particle in free space), there are important theoretical differences. For example, while regular momentum is completely conserved, crystal momentum is only conserved to within a lattice vector. For example, an electron can be described not only by the wave vector $\mathbf{k}$, but also with any other wave vector $\mathbf{k}'$such that
$$\mathbf{k'} = \mathbf{k} + \mathbf{K},$$
where $\mathbf{K}$ is an arbitrary reciprocal lattice vector. This is a consequence of the fact that the lattice symmetry is discrete as opposed to continuous, and thus its associated conservation law cannot be derived using Noether's theorem.

== Physical significance ==
The phase modulation of the Bloch state $\psi_n({\mathbf{x}}) = e^{i \mathbf{k} \cdot \mathbf{x}} u_{n \mathbf{k}}(\mathbf{x})$ is the same as that of a free particle with momentum $\hbar k$, i.e. $k$ gives the state's periodicity, which is not the same as that of the lattice. This modulation contributes to the kinetic energy of the particle (whereas the modulation is entirely responsible for the kinetic energy of a free particle).

In regions where the band is approximately parabolic the crystal momentum is equal to the momentum of a free particle with momentum $\hbar k$ if we assign the particle an effective mass that's related to the curvature of the parabola.

=== Relation to velocity ===
A wave packet with dispersion, which causes the group velocity and phase velocity to be different. This image is a 1-dimensional real wave, but electron wave packets are 3-dimensional complex waves.

Crystal momentum corresponds to the physically measurable concept of velocity according to
$$\mathbf{v}_n(\mathbf{k}) = \frac{1}{\hbar} \nabla_{\mathbf{k}} E_n(\mathbf{k}).$$
This is the same formula as the group velocity of a wave. More specifically, due to the Heisenberg uncertainty principle, an electron in a crystal cannot have both an exactly defined k and an exact position in the crystal. It can, however, form a wave packet centered on momentum k (with slight uncertainty), and centered on a certain position (with slight uncertainty). The center position of this wave packet changes as the wave propagates, moving through the crystal at the velocity v given by the formula above. In a real crystal, an electron moves in this way—traveling in a certain direction at a certain speed—for only a short period of time, before colliding with an imperfection in the crystal that causes it to move in a different, random direction. These collisions, called electron scattering, are most commonly caused by crystallographic defects, the crystal surface, and random thermal vibrations of the atoms in the crystal (phonons).

=== Response to electric and magnetic fields ===
Crystal momentum also plays a seminal role in the semiclassical model of electron dynamics, where it follows from the acceleration theorem that it obeys the equations of motion (in cgs units):
$$\mathbf{v}_n(\mathbf{k}) = \frac{1}{\hbar} \nabla_{\mathbf{k}} E_n(\mathbf{k}),$$
$$\mathbf{\dot{p}}_{\text{crystal}} = -e \left( {\mathbf{E}} +\tfrac{1}{c} {\mathbf{v}} \times {\mathbf{H}} \right)$$

Here perhaps the analogy between crystal momentum and true momentum is at its most powerful, for these are precisely the equations that a free space electron obeys in the absence of any crystal structure. Crystal momentum also earns its chance to shine in these types of calculations, for, in order to calculate an electron's trajectory of motion using the above equations, one need only consider external fields, while attempting the calculation from a set of equations of motion based on true momentum would require taking into account individual Coulomb and Lorentz forces of every single lattice ion in addition to the external field.

== Applications ==
=== Angle-resolved photo-emission spectroscopy (ARPES) ===
In angle-resolved photo-emission spectroscopy (ARPES), irradiating light on a crystal sample results in the ejection of an electron away from the crystal. Throughout the course of the interaction, one is allowed to conflate the two concepts of crystal and true momentum and thereby gain direct knowledge of a crystal's band structure. That is to say, an electron's crystal momentum inside the crystal becomes its true momentum after it leaves, and the true momentum may be subsequently inferred from the equation
$$\mathbf{p}_{\parallel} = \sqrt{2 m E_{\text{kin}}} \sin \theta$$
by measuring the angle and kinetic energy at which the electron exits the crystal, where $m$ is a single electron's mass. Because crystal symmetry in the direction normal to the crystal surface is lost at the crystal boundary, crystal momentum in this direction is not conserved. Consequently, the only directions in which useful ARPES data can be gleaned are directions parallel to the crystal surface.
