= Particle in a one-dimensional lattice =

Model in Quantum Physics

In quantum mechanics, the particle in a one-dimensional lattice is a problem that occurs in the model of a periodic crystal lattice. The potential is caused by ions in the periodic structure of the crystal creating an electromagnetic field so electrons are subject to a regular potential inside the lattice. It is a generalization of the free electron model, which assumes zero potential inside the lattice.

== Problem definition ==
When talking about solid materials, the discussion is mainly around crystals – periodic lattices. Here we will discuss a 1D lattice of positive ions. Assuming the spacing between two ions is a, the potential in the lattice will look something like this:

The mathematical representation of the potential is a periodic function with a period a. According to Bloch's theorem, the wavefunction solution of the Schrödinger equation when the potential is periodic, can be written as:

$$\psi (x) = e^{ikx} u(x),$$

where u(x) is a periodic function which satisfies u(x + a) = u(x). It is the Bloch factor with Floquet exponent $k$ which gives rise to the band structure of the energy spectrum of the Schrödinger equation with a periodic potential like the Kronig–Penney potential or a cosine function as it was shown in 1928 by Strutt. The solutions can be given with the help of the Mathieu functions.

When nearing the edges of the lattice, there are problems with the boundary condition. Therefore, we can represent the ion lattice as a ring following the Born–von Karman boundary conditions. If L is the length of the lattice so that L ≫ a, then the number of ions in the lattice is so big, that when considering one ion, its surrounding is almost linear, and the wavefunction of the electron is unchanged. So now, instead of two boundary conditions we get one circular boundary condition:
$$\psi (0)=\psi (L).$$

If N is the number of ions in the lattice, then we have the relation: aN = L. Replacing in the boundary condition and applying Bloch's theorem will result in a quantization for k:
$$\psi (0) = e^{ik \cdot 0} u(0) = e^{ikL} u(L) = \psi (L)$$
$$u(0) = e^{ikL} u(L)=e^{ikL} u(N a) \to e^{ikL} = 1$$
$$\Rightarrow kL = 2\pi n \to k = {2\pi \over L} n \qquad \left( n=0, \pm 1, \dots, \pm \frac{N}{2} \right).$$

== Kronig–Penney model ==
The Kronig–Penney model (named after Ralph Kronig and William Penney) is a simple, idealized quantum-mechanical system that consists of an infinite periodic array of rectangular potential barriers.

The potential function is approximated by a rectangular potential:

Using Bloch's theorem, we only need to find a solution for a single period, make sure it is continuous and smooth, and to make sure the function u(x) is also continuous and smooth.

Considering a single period of the potential:
We have two regions here. We will solve for each independently: Let E be an energy value above the well (E>0)

- For $0 < x < (a-b)$:
  $$\begin{align}
\frac{-\hbar^2}{2m} \psi_{xx} &= E \psi \\
\Rightarrow \psi &= A e^{i \alpha x} + A' e^{-i \alpha x} & \left( \alpha^2 = {2mE \over \hbar^2} \right)
\end{align}$$
- For $-b <x < 0$:
  $$\begin{align}
\frac{-\hbar^2}{2m} \psi_{xx} &= (E+V_0)\psi \\
\Rightarrow \psi &= B e^{i \beta x} + B' e^{-i \beta x} & \left( \beta^2 = {2m(E+V_0) \over \hbar^2} \right).
\end{align}$$

To find u(x) in each region, we need to manipulate the electron's wavefunction:
$$\begin{align}
\psi(0<x<a-b) &= A e^{i \alpha x} + A' e^{-i \alpha x} = e^{ikx} \left( A e^{i (\alpha-k) x} + A' e^{-i (\alpha+k) x} \right) \\
\Rightarrow u(0<x<a-b) &= A e^{i (\alpha-k) x} + A' e^{-i (\alpha+k) x}.
\end{align}$$

And in the same manner:
$$u(-b<x<0)=B e^{i (\beta-k) x} + B' e^{-i (\beta+k) x}.$$

To complete the solution we need to make sure the probability function is continuous and smooth, i.e.:
$$\psi(0^{-})=\psi(0^{+}) \qquad \psi'(0^{-})=\psi'(0^{+}).$$

And that u(x) and u′(x) are periodic:
$$u(-b)=u(a-b) \qquad u'(-b)=u'(a-b).$$

These conditions yield the following matrix:
$$\begin{pmatrix}
1 & 1 & -1 & -1 \\
\alpha & -\alpha & -\beta & \beta \\
e^{i(\alpha-k)(a-b)} & e^{-i(\alpha+k)(a-b)} & -e^{-i(\beta-k)b} & -e^{i(\beta+k)b} \\
(\alpha-k)e^{i(\alpha-k)(a-b)} & -(\alpha+k)e^{-i(\alpha+k)(a-b)} & -(\beta-k)e^{-i(\beta-k)b} & (\beta+k)e^{i(\beta+k)b} \end{pmatrix}
\begin{pmatrix} A \\ A' \\ B \\ B' \end{pmatrix}
= \begin{pmatrix} 0 \\ 0 \\ 0 \\ 0 \end{pmatrix}.$$

For us to have a non-trivial solution, the determinant of the matrix must be 0. This leads us to the following expression:
$$\cos(k a) = \cos(\beta b) \cos[\alpha(a-b)]-{\alpha^2+\beta^2 \over 2\alpha \beta} \sin(\beta b) \sin[\alpha(a-b)].$$

To further simplify the expression, we perform the following approximations:
$$b \to 0; \quad V_0 \to \infty; \quad V_0 b = \mathrm{constant}$$
$$\Rightarrow \beta^2 b = \mathrm{constant}; \quad \alpha^2 b \to 0$$
$$\Rightarrow \beta b \to 0; \quad \sin(\beta b) \to \beta b; \quad \cos(\beta b) \to 1.$$

The expression will now be:
$$\cos(k a) = \cos(\alpha a)+P \frac{\sin(\alpha a)}{\alpha a}, \qquad P= \frac{m V_0 ba}{\hbar^2}.$$

For energy values inside the well (E < 0), we get:
$$\cos(k a) = \cos(\beta b) \cosh[\alpha(a-b)]-{\beta^2-\alpha^2 \over 2\alpha \beta} \sin(\beta b) \sinh[\alpha(a-b)],$$
with $\alpha^2 = {2 m |E| \over \hbar^2}$ and $\beta^2 = \frac{2 m (V_0-|E|)}{\hbar^2}$.

Following the same approximations as above ($b \to 0; \, V_0 \to \infty; \, V_0 b = \mathrm{constant}$), we arrive at
$$\cos(k a) = \cosh(\alpha a) + P \frac{\sinh(\alpha a)}{\alpha a}$$
with the same formula for P as in the previous case $\left(P = \frac{m V_0 b a}{\hbar^2}\right)$.

== Band gaps in the Kronig–Penney model ==
The value of the expression to which cos(k a) is equated in the dispersion relation, with P = 1.5. The black bars denote regions of $\alpha a$ for which k can be calculated.

The dispersion relation for the Kronig–Penney model, with P = 1.5.

In the previous paragraph, the only variables not determined by the parameters of the physical system are the energy E and the crystal momentum k. By picking a value for E, one can compute the right hand side, and then compute k by taking the $\arccos$ of both sides. Thus, the expression gives rise to the dispersion relation.

The right hand side of the last expression above can sometimes be greater than 1 or less than –1, in which case there is no value of k that can make the equation true. Since $\alpha a \propto \sqrt{E}$, that means there are certain values of E for which there are no eigenfunctions of the Schrödinger equation. These values constitute the band gap.

Thus, the Kronig–Penney model is one of the simplest periodic potentials to exhibit a band gap.

== Kronig–Penney model: alternative solution ==
An alternative treatment to a similar problem is given. Here we have a delta periodic potential:
$$V(x) = A\cdot\sum_{n=-\infty}^{\infty}\delta(x - n a).$$

A is some constant, and a is the lattice constant (the spacing between each site). Since this potential is periodic, we could expand it as a Fourier series:
$$V(x) = \sum_K \tilde{V}(K)\cdot e^{i K x},$$
where
$$\tilde{V}(K) = \frac{1}{a}\int_{-a/2}^{a/2}dx\,V(x)\,e^{-i K x} = \frac{1}{a}\int_{-a/2}^{a/2} dx \sum_{n=-\infty}^{\infty} A\cdot \delta(x-na)\,e^{-i K x} = \frac{A}{a}.$$

The wave-function, using Bloch's theorem, is equal to $\psi_k(x) = e^{i k x} u_k(x)$ where $u_k(x)$ is a function that is periodic in the lattice, which means that we can expand it as a Fourier series as well:
$$u_k(x)=\sum_{K} \tilde{u}_k(K)e^{i K x}.$$

Thus the wave function is:
$$\psi_k(x)=\sum_{K}\tilde{u}_k(K)\,e^{i(k+K)x}.$$

Putting this into the Schrödinger equation, we get:
$$\left[\frac{\hbar^2(k+K)^2}{2m}-E_k\right] \tilde{u}_k(K)+\sum_{K'}\tilde{V}(K-K')\,\tilde{u}_k(K') = 0$$
or rather:
$$\left[\frac{\hbar^2(k+K)^2}{2m}-E_k\right] \tilde{u}_k(K)+\frac{A}{a}\sum_{K'}\tilde{u}_k(K')=0$$

Now we recognize that:
$$u_k(0)=\sum_{K'}\tilde{u}_k(K')$$

Plug this into the Schrödinger equation:
$$\left[\frac{\hbar^2(k+K)^2}{2m}-E_k\right] \tilde{u}_k(K)+\frac{A}{a}u_k(0)=0$$

Solving this for $\tilde{u}_k(K)$ we get:
$$\tilde{u}_k(K)=\frac{\frac{2m}{\hbar^2}\frac{A}{a}f(k)}{\frac{2mE_k}{\hbar^2}-(k+K)^2}=\frac{\frac{2m}{\hbar^2}\frac{A}{a}}{\frac{2mE_k}{\hbar^2}-(k+K)^2}\,u_k(0)$$

We sum this last equation over all values of K to arrive at:
$$\sum_{K}\tilde{u}_k(K)=\sum_{K}\frac{\frac{2m}{\hbar^2}\frac{A}{a}}{\frac{2mE_k}{\hbar^2}-(k+K)^2}\,u_k(0)$$

Or:
$$u_k(0)=\sum_{K}\frac{\frac{2m}{\hbar^2}\frac{A}{a}}{\frac{2mE_k}{\hbar^2}-(k+K)^2}\,u_k(0)$$

Conveniently, $u_k(0)$ cancels out and we get:
$$1=\sum_{K}\frac{\frac{2m}{\hbar^2}\frac{A}{a}}{\frac{2mE_k}{\hbar^2}-(k+K)^2}$$

Or:
$$\frac{\hbar^2}{2m}\frac{a}{A}=\sum_{K}\frac{1}{\frac{2mE_k}{\hbar^2}-(k+K)^2}$$

To save ourselves some unnecessary notational effort we define a new variable:
$$\alpha^2 := \frac{2 m E_k}{\hbar^2}$$
and finally our expression is:
$$\frac{\hbar^2}{2m}\frac{a}{A}=\sum_{K}\frac{1}{\alpha^2-(k+K)^2}$$

Now, K is a reciprocal lattice vector, which means that a sum over K is actually a sum over integer multiples of $\frac{2\pi}{a}$:
$$\frac{\hbar^2}{2m}\frac{a}{A}=\sum_{n=-\infty}^{\infty}\frac{1}{\alpha^2-(k+\frac{2\pi n}{a})^2}$$

We can juggle this expression a little bit to make it more suggestive (use partial fraction decomposition):
$$\begin{align}
\frac{\hbar^2}{2m}\frac{a}{A} &= \sum_{n=-\infty}^{\infty}\frac{1}{\alpha^2-(k+\frac{2\pi n}{a})^2} \\
&=-\frac{1}{2\alpha}\sum_{n=-\infty}^{\infty}\left[\frac{1}{(k+\frac{2\pi n}{a})-\alpha}-\frac{1}{(k+\frac{2\pi n}{a})+\alpha}\right] \\
&=-\frac{a}{4\alpha}\sum_{n=-\infty}^{\infty}\left[\frac{1}{\pi n + \frac{k a}{2}-\frac{\alpha a}{2}}-\frac{1}{\pi n +\frac{k a}{2}+\frac{\alpha a} {2}} \right] \\
&=-\frac{a}{4\alpha}\left[\sum_{n=-\infty}^{\infty}\frac{1}{\pi n + \frac{k a}{2}-\frac{\alpha a}{2}} - \sum_{n=-\infty}^{\infty}\frac{1}{\pi n +\frac{k a}{2}+\frac{\alpha a}{2}} \right]
\end{align}$$

If we use a nice identity of a sum of the cotangent function (Equation 18) which says:
$$\cot(x)=\sum_{n=-\infty}^{\infty}\frac{1}{2 \pi n + 2x}-\frac{1}{2 \pi n - 2x}$$
and plug it into our expression we get to:
$$\frac{\hbar^2}{2m}\frac{a}{A} = -\frac{a}{4\alpha}\left[\cot\left(\tfrac{k a}{2}-\tfrac{\alpha a}{2}\right) - \cot\left(\tfrac{k a}{2}+\tfrac{\alpha a}{2}\right)\right]$$

We use the sum of cot and then, the product of sin (which is part of the formula for the sum of cot) to arrive at:
$$\cos(k a)=\cos(\alpha a)+\frac{m A}{\hbar^2 \alpha}\sin(\alpha a)$$

This equation shows the relation between the energy (through α) and the wave-vector, k, and as you can see, since the left hand side of the equation can only range from −1 to 1 then there are some limits on the values that α (and thus, the energy) can take, that is, at some ranges of values of the energy, there is no solution according to these equation, and thus, the system will not have those energies: energy gaps. These are the so-called band-gaps, which can be shown to exist in any shape of periodic potential (not just delta or square barriers).

For a different and detailed calculation of the gap formula (i.e. for the gap between bands) and the level splitting of eigenvalues of the one-dimensional Schrödinger equation see Müller-Kirsten. Corresponding results for the cosine potential (Mathieu equation) are also given in detail in this reference.

== Finite lattice ==
In some cases, the Schrödinger equation can be solved analytically on a one-dimensional lattice of finite length using the theory of periodic differential equations. The length of the lattice is assumed to be $L = N a$, where $a$ is the potential period and the number of periods $N$ is a positive integer. The two ends of the lattice are at $\tau$ and $L + \tau$, where $\tau$ determines the point of termination. The wavefunction vanishes outside the interval $[\tau,L+\tau]$.

The eigenstates of the finite system can be found in terms of the Bloch states of an infinite system with the same periodic potential. If there is a band gap between two consecutive energy bands of the infinite system, there is a sharp distinction between two types of states in the finite lattice. For each energy band of the infinite system, there are $N - 1$ bulk states whose energies depend on the length $N$ but not on the termination $\tau$. These states are standing waves constructed as a superposition of two Bloch states with momenta $k$ and $-k$, where $k$ is chosen so that the wavefunction vanishes at the boundaries. The energies of these states match the energy bands of the infinite system.

For each band gap, there is one additional state. The energies of these states depend on the point of termination $\tau$ but not on the length $N$. The energy of such a state can lie either at the band edge or within the band gap. If the energy is within the band gap, the state is a surface state localized at one end of the lattice, but if the energy is at the band edge, the state is delocalized across the lattice.

== See also ==
- Empty lattice approximation
- Nearly free electron model
- Crystal structure
