= Independent electron approximation =

Simplification that approximates the electron–electron interaction in crystals as null

In condensed matter physics, the independent electron approximation is a simplification used in complex systems, consisting of many electrons, that approximates the electron–electron interaction in crystals as null. It is a requirement for both the free electron model and the nearly-free electron model, where it is used alongside Bloch's theorem. In quantum mechanics, this approximation is often used to simplify a quantum many-body problem into single-particle approximations.

While this simplification holds for many systems, electron–electron interactions may be very important for certain properties in materials. For example, the theory covering much of superconductivity is BCS theory, in which the attraction of pairs of electrons to each other, termed "Cooper pairs", is the mechanism behind superconductivity. One major effect of electron–electron interactions is that electrons distribute around the ions so that they screen the ions in the lattice from other electrons.

== Quantum treatment ==
For an example of the Independent electron approximation's usefulness in quantum mechanics, consider an N-atom crystal with one free electron per atom (each with atomic number Z). Neglecting spin, the Hamiltonian of the system takes the form:

$$\mathcal{H} = \sum_{i=1}^{N} \left( \frac{-\hbar^2 \nabla_i^2}{2m_e} - \sum_{I=0}^{N}\frac{e^2Z}{\left | \mathbf{r}_i - \mathbf{R}_I \right |} + \frac{1}{2}\sum_{i \neq j}^{N}\frac{e^2}{\left | \mathbf{r}_i - \mathbf{r}_j \right |} \right ) ,$$

where $\hbar$ is the reduced Planck constant, e is the elementary charge, m_{e} is the electron rest mass, and $\nabla_i$ is the gradient operator for electron i. The capitalized $\mathbf{R}_I$ is the Ith lattice location (the equilibrium position of the Ith nuclei) and the lowercase $\mathbf{r}_i$ is the ith electron position.

The first term in parentheses is called the kinetic energy operator while the last two are simply the Coulomb interaction terms for electron–nucleus and electron–electron interactions, respectively. If the electron–electron term were negligible, the Hamiltonian could be decomposed into a set of N decoupled Hamiltonians (one for each electron), which greatly simplifies analysis. The electron–electron interaction term, however, prevents this decomposition by ensuring that the Hamiltonian for each electron will include terms for the position of every other electron in the system. If the electron–electron interaction term is sufficiently small, however, the Coulomb interactions terms can be approximated by an effective potential term, which neglects electron–electron interactions. This is known as the independent electron approximation. Bloch's theorem relies on this approximation by setting the effective potential term to a periodic potential of the form $V(\mathbf{r})$ that satisfies $V(\mathbf{r} + \mathbf{R}_j) = V(\mathbf{r})$, where $\mathbf{R}_j$ is any reciprocal lattice vector (see Bloch's theorem). This approximation can be formalized using methods from the Hartree–Fock approximation or density functional theory.

== See also ==
- Strongly correlated material
