= Solid-state physics =

Branch of physics focused on matter in the solid state

Solid-state physics is the study of rigid matter, or solids, through methods such as solid-state chemistry, quantum mechanics, crystallography, electromagnetism, and metallurgy. It is the largest branch of condensed matter physics. Solid-state physics studies how the large-scale properties of solid materials result from their atomic-scale properties. Thus, solid-state physics forms a theoretical basis of materials science. Along with solid-state chemistry, it also has direct applications in the technology of transistors and semiconductors.

== Background ==
Solid materials are formed from densely packed atoms, which interact intensely. These interactions produce the mechanical (e.g. hardness and elasticity), thermal, electrical, magnetic and optical properties of solids. Depending on the material involved and the conditions in which it was formed, the atoms may be arranged in a regular, geometric pattern (crystalline solids, which include metals and ordinary water ice) or irregularly (an amorphous solid such as common window glass).

The bulk of solid-state physics, as a general theory, is focused on crystals. Primarily, this is because the periodicity of atoms in a crystal – its defining characteristic – facilitates mathematical modeling. Likewise, crystalline materials often have electrical, magnetic, optical, or mechanical properties that can be exploited for engineering purposes.

The forces between the atoms in a crystal can take a variety of forms. For example, in a crystal of sodium chloride (common salt), the crystal is made up of ionic sodium and chlorine, and held together with ionic bonds. In others, the atoms share electrons and form covalent bonds. In metals, electrons are shared amongst the whole crystal in metallic bonding. Finally, the noble gases do not undergo any of these types of bonding. In solid form, the noble gases are held together with van der Waals forces resulting from the polarisation of the electronic charge cloud on each atom. The differences between the types of solid result from the differences between their bonding.

== History ==
The physical properties of solids have been common subjects of scientific inquiry for centuries, but a separate field going by the name of solid-state physics did not emerge until the 1940s, in particular with the establishment of the Division of Solid State Physics (DSSP) within the American Physical Society. The DSSP catered to industrial physicists, and solid-state physics became associated with the technological applications made possible by research on solids. By the early 1960s, the DSSP was the largest division of the American Physical Society.

Large communities of solid state physicists also emerged in Europe after World War II, in particular in England, Germany, and the Soviet Union. In the United States and Europe, solid state became a prominent field through its investigations into semiconductors, superconductivity, nuclear magnetic resonance, and diverse other phenomena. During the early Cold War, research in solid state physics was often not restricted to solids, which led some physicists in the 1970s and 1980s to found the field of condensed matter physics, which organized around common techniques used to investigate solids, liquids, plasmas, and other complex matter. Today, solid-state physics is broadly considered to be the subfield of condensed matter physics, often referred to as hard condensed matter, that focuses on the properties of solids with regular crystal lattices.

== Crystal structure and properties ==
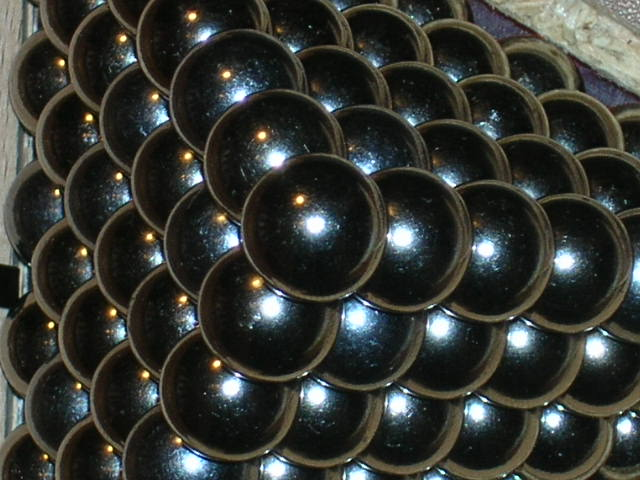
An example of a cubic lattice

Many properties of materials are affected by their crystal structure. This structure can be investigated using a range of crystallographic techniques, including X-ray crystallography, neutron diffraction and electron diffraction.

The sizes of the individual crystals in a crystalline solid material vary depending on the material involved and the conditions when it was formed. Most crystalline materials encountered in everyday life are polycrystalline, with the individual crystals being microscopic in scale, but macroscopic single crystals can be produced either naturally (e.g. diamonds) or artificially.

Real crystals feature defects or irregularities in the ideal arrangements, and it is these defects that critically determine many of the electrical and mechanical properties of real materials.

== Electronic properties ==
Properties of materials such as electrical conduction and heat capacity are investigated by solid state physics. An early model of electrical conduction was the Drude model, which applied kinetic theory to the electrons in a solid. By assuming that the material contains immobile positive ions and an "electron gas" of classical, non-interacting electrons, the Drude model was able to explain electrical and thermal conductivity and the Hall effect in metals, although it greatly overestimated the electronic heat capacity.

Arnold Sommerfeld combined the classical Drude model with quantum mechanics in the free electron model (or Drude-Sommerfeld model). Here, the electrons are modelled as a Fermi gas, a gas of particles which obey the quantum mechanical Fermi–Dirac statistics. The free electron model gave improved predictions for the heat capacity of metals, however, it was unable to explain the existence of insulators.

The nearly free electron model is a modification of the free electron model which includes a weak periodic perturbation meant to model the interaction between the conduction electrons and the ions in a crystalline solid. By introducing the idea of electronic bands, the theory explains the existence of conductors, semiconductors and insulators.

The nearly free electron model rewrites the Schrödinger equation for the case of a periodic potential. The solutions in this case are known as Bloch states. Since Bloch's theorem applies only to periodic potentials, and since unceasing random movements of atoms in a crystal disrupt periodicity, this use of Bloch's theorem is only an approximation, but it has proven to be a tremendously valuable approximation, without which most solid-state physics analysis would be intractable. Deviations from periodicity are treated by quantum mechanical perturbation theory.

== Modern research ==
Modern research topics in solid-state physics include:

- High-temperature superconductivity
- Quasicrystals
- Spin glass
- Strongly correlated materials
- Two-dimensional materials
- Nanomaterials

== See also ==
- Condensed matter physics
- Crystallography
- Nuclear spectroscopy
- Solid mechanics
