= Quantum simulator =

Simulators of quantum mechanical systems

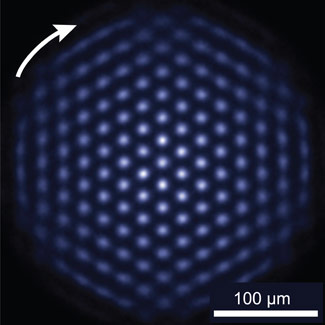
In this photograph of a quantum simulator crystal the ions are fluorescing, indicating the qubits are all in the same state (either "1" or "0"). Under the right experimental conditions, the ion crystal spontaneously forms this nearly perfect triangular lattice structure. Credit: Britton/NIST

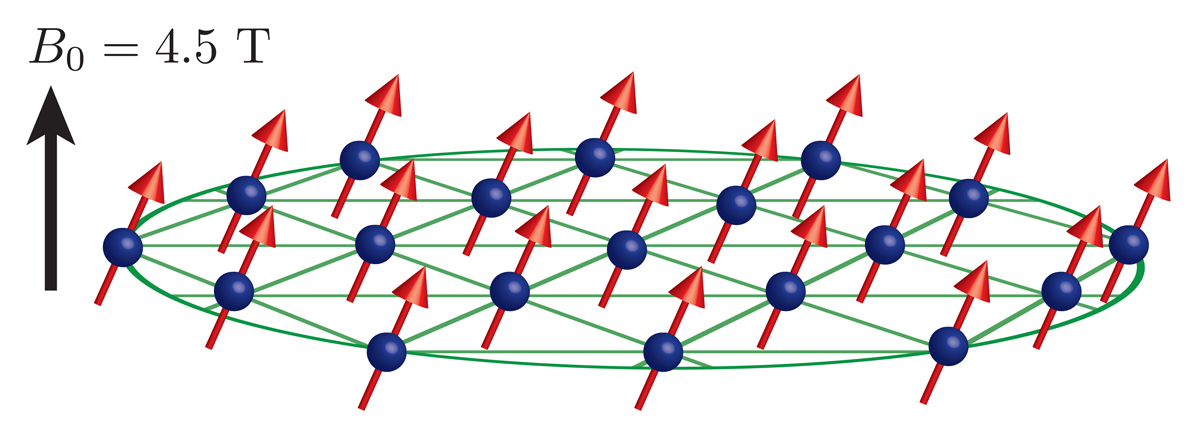
Trapped ion quantum simulator illustration: The heart of the simulator is a two-dimensional crystal of beryllium ions (blue spheres in the graphic); the outermost electron of each ion is a quantum bit (qubit, red arrows). The ions are confined by a large magnetic field in a device called a Penning trap (not shown). Inside the trap the crystal rotates clockwise. Credit: Britton/NIST

Quantum simulators permit the study of a quantum system in a programmable fashion, most often this is done using trapped atom systems. These systems have their own Hamiltonians, which can often be modified with a few free parameters to map onto other physical systems. Often times simulating these systems becomes either classically challenging, or even impossible. These analog quantum simulators can be contratested to the generally programmable "digital" quantum computers, which would be capable of solving a wider class of quantum problems. However, these fully programmable quantum computers have yet to be realized and the online quantum computer simulations currently run using classical electronics.

A universal quantum simulator is a quantum computer proposed by Yuri Manin in 1980 and Richard Feynman in 1982.

A quantum system may be simulated by either a Turing machine or a quantum Turing machine, as a classical Turing machine is able to simulate a universal quantum computer (and therefore any simpler quantum simulator), meaning they are equivalent from the point of view of computability theory. The simulation of quantum physics by a classical computer has been shown to be inefficient. In other words, quantum computers provide no additional power over classical computers in terms of computability, but it is suspected that they can solve certain problems faster than classical computers, meaning they may be in different complexity classes, which is why quantum Turing machines are useful for simulating quantum systems. This is known as quantum supremacy, the idea that there are problems only quantum Turing machines can solve in any feasible amount of time.

A quantum system of many particles could be simulated by a quantum computer using a number of quantum bits similar to the number of particles in the original system. This has been extended to much larger classes of quantum systems.

Quantum simulators have been realized on a number of experimental platforms, including systems of ultracold quantum gases, polar molecules, trapped ions, photonic systems, quantum dots, and superconducting circuits.

== Solving physics problems ==
Many important problems in physics, especially low-temperature physics and many-body physics, remain poorly understood because the underlying quantum mechanics is vastly complex. Conventional computers, including supercomputers, are inadequate for simulating quantum systems with as few as 30 particles because the dimension of the Hilbert space grows exponentially with particle number. Better computational tools are needed to understand and rationally design materials whose properties are believed to depend on the collective quantum behavior of hundreds of particles. Quantum simulators provide an alternative route to understanding the properties of these systems. These simulators create clean realizations of specific systems of interest, which allows precise realizations of their properties. Precise control over and broad tunability of parameters of the system allows the influence of various parameters to be cleanly disentangled.

Quantum simulators can solve problems which are difficult to simulate on classical computers because they directly exploit quantum properties of real particles. In particular, they exploit a property of quantum mechanics called superposition, wherein a quantum particle is made to be in two distinct states at the same time, for example, aligned and anti-aligned with an external magnetic field. Crucially, simulators also take advantage of a second quantum property called entanglement, allowing the behavior of even physically well separated particles to be correlated.

Recently quantum simulators have been used to obtain time crystals and quantum spin liquids.

== Trapped-ion simulators ==
Ion trap based system forms an ideal setting for simulating interactions in quantum spin models. A trapped-ion simulator, built by a team that included the NIST, can engineer and control interactions among hundreds of quantum bits (qubits). Previous endeavors were unable to go beyond 30 quantum bits. The capability of this simulator is 10 times more than previous devices. It has passed a series of important benchmarking tests that indicate a capability to solve problems in material science that are impossible to model on conventional computers.

The trapped-ion simulator consists of a tiny, single-plane crystal of hundreds of beryllium ions, less than 1 millimeter in diameter, hovering inside a device called a Penning trap. The outermost electron of each ion acts as a tiny quantum magnet and is used as a qubit, the quantum equivalent of a "1" or a "0" in a conventional computer. In the benchmarking experiment, physicists used laser beams to cool the ions to near absolute zero. Carefully timed microwave and laser pulses then caused the qubits to interact, mimicking the quantum behavior of materials otherwise very difficult to study in the laboratory. Although the two systems may outwardly appear dissimilar, their behavior is engineered to be mathematically identical. In this way, simulators allow researchers to vary parameters that could not be changed in natural solids, such as atomic lattice spacing and geometry.

Friedenauer et al., adiabatically manipulated 2 spins, showing their separation into ferromagnetic and antiferromagnetic states. Kim et al., extended the trapped ion quantum simulator to 3 spins, with global antiferromagnetic Ising interactions featuring frustration and showing the link between frustration and entanglement and Islam et al., used adiabatic quantum simulation to demonstrate the sharpening of a phase transition between paramagnetic and ferromagnetic ordering as the number of spins increased from 2 to 9. Barreiro et al. created a digital quantum simulator of interacting spins with up to 5 trapped ions by coupling to an open reservoir and Lanyon et al. demonstrated digital quantum simulation with up to 6 ions. Islam, et al., demonstrated adiabatic quantum simulation of the transverse Ising model with variable (long) range interactions with up to 18 trapped ion spins, showing control of the level of spin frustration by adjusting the antiferromagnetic interaction range. Britton, et al. from NIST has experimentally benchmarked Ising interactions in a system of hundreds of qubits for studies of quantum magnetism. Pagano, et al., reported a new cryogenic ion trapping system designed for long time storage of large ion chains demonstrating coherent one and two-qubit operations for chains of up to 44 ions. Joshi, et al., probed the quantum dynamics of 51 individually controlled ions, realizing a long-range interacting spin chain.

== Ultracold atom simulators ==
Many ultracold atom experiments are examples of quantum simulators. These include experiments studying bosons or fermions in optical lattices, the unitary Fermi gas, Rydberg atom arrays in optical tweezers. A common thread among these experiments is the capability of realizing generic Hamiltonians, such as the Hubbard or transverse-field Ising Hamiltonian. Major aims of these experiments include identifying low-temperature phases or tracking out-of-equilibrium dynamics for various models, problems which are theoretically and numerically intractable. Other experiments have realized condensed matter models in regimes which are difficult or impossible to realize with conventional materials, such as the Haldane model and the Harper-Hofstadter model, or simulated lattice gauge theories.

== Superconducting qubits ==
Quantum simulators using superconducting qubits fall into two main categories. First, so called quantum annealers determine ground states of certain Hamiltonians after an adiabatic ramp. This approach is sometimes called adiabatic quantum computing. Second, many systems emulate specific Hamiltonians and study their ground state properties, quantum phase transitions, or time dynamics. Several important recent results include the realization of a Mott insulator in a driven-dissipative Bose-Hubbard system and studies of phase transitions in lattices of superconducting resonators coupled to qubits.

== See also ==
- Hamiltonian simulation
- Quantum Turing machine
- Quantum computing
