= T-J model =

Model of electrical resistance

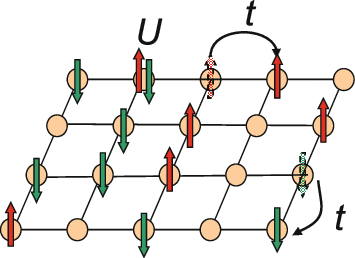
2D Hubbard model. The t-J model is the Hubbard model for U >> t

In solid-state physics, the t-J model is a model first derived by Józef Spałek and Andrzej M. Oleś to explain antiferromagnetic properties of Mott insulators, taking into account experimental results about the strength of electron-electron repulsion in these materials.

The material is modelled as a lattice with atoms in the sites with conduction electrons (or holes) moving between them, like in the Hubbard model. Unlike the Hubbard model, the electrons are strongly-correlated, meaning the electrons are sensitive to reciprocal coulombic repulsion, and so are less likely to occupy lattice sites already occupied by another electron. In the basic Hubbard model, the repulsion, indicated by U, can be small or even zero, and electrons are more free to jump (hopping, parametrized by t as transfer or tunnel) from one site to another. In the t-J model, instead of U, there is the parameter J, function of the ratio t/U.

Like the Hubbard model, it is a prospective microscopic theory of high temperature superconductivity in cuprate superconductors which arise from doped antiferromagnets, particularly in the case where the lattice considered is the two-dimensional lattice. Cuprate superconductors are currently (as of 2024) the superconductors with the highest known superconducting transition temperature at ambient pressure, but there is no consensus on the microscopic theory responsible for their superconducting transition.

== The Hamiltonian ==
In quantum physics, system's models are usually based on the Hamiltonian operator $\hat H$, corresponding to the total energy of that system, including both kinetic energy and potential energy.

The t-J Hamiltonian can be derived from the $\hat H$ of the Hubbard model using the Schrieffer–Wolff transformation, with the transformation generator depending on t/U and excluding the possibility for electrons to doubly occupy a lattice's site, which results in:

$$\hat H = -t\sum_{\langle ij\rangle,\sigma} \left( c_{i\sigma}^{\dagger} c_{j\sigma} + \mathrm{h.c.} \right)
+ J\sum_{\langle ij\rangle}\left(\mathbf{S}_{i}\cdot \mathbf{S}_{j}-\frac{n_in_j}{4}\right) + O(t^3/U^2)$$

where the term in t corresponds to the kinetic energy and is equal to the one in the Hubbard model. The second one is the potential energy approximated at the second order, because this is an approximation of the Hubbard model in the limit U >> t developed in power of t. Terms at higher order can be added.

The parameters are:

- is the sum over nearest-neighbor sites i and j, for all sites, typically on a two-dimensional square lattice,
- c^{†}_{iσ}, c_{iσ} are the fermionic creation and annihilation operators at site i,
- σ is the spin polarization,
- t is the hopping integral,
- J is the antiferromagnetic exchange coupling, J = 4t^{2}/U,
- U is the on-site coulombic repulsion, that must satisfy the condition for U >> t,
- n_{i} = c^{†}_{iσ}c_{iσ} is the particle number at site i and can be maximum 1, so that double occupancy is forbidden (in the Hubbard model is possible),
- S_{i} and S_{j} are the spins on sites i and j,
- h. c. stands for Hermitian conjugate,

If n_{i} = 1, that is when in the ground state, there is just one electron per lattice's site (half-filling), the model reduces to the Heisenberg model and the ground state reproduce a dielectric antiferromagnets (Mott insulator).

The model can be further extended considering also the next-nearest-neighbor sites and the chemical potential to set the ground state in function of the total number of particles:

$$\mathcal{\hat H} = t_1 \sum\limits_{\langle i,j \rangle} \left( c_{i\sigma}^{\dagger} c_{j\sigma} + \mathrm{h.c.} \right) \ + \ t_2 \sum\limits_{\langle\langle i,j \rangle\rangle} \left( c_{i\sigma}^{\dagger} c_{j\sigma} + \mathrm{h.c.} \right) \ + \ J \sum\limits_{\langle i,j \rangle} \left( \mathbf{S}_{i} \cdot \mathbf{S}_{j} - \frac{ n_{i} n_{j} }{4}\right)   - \ \mu\sum\limits_{i} n_{i} ,$$

where ⟨...⟩ and ⟨⟨...⟩⟩ denote the nearest and next-nearest neighbors, respectively, with two different values for the hopping integral (t_{1} and t_{2}) and μ is the chemical potential.
