= Bose–Hubbard model =

Model of interacting spinless bosons on a lattice

The Bose–Hubbard model gives a description of the physics of interacting spinless bosons on a lattice. It is closely related to the Hubbard model that originated in solid-state physics as an approximate description of superconducting systems and the motion of electrons between the atoms of a crystalline solid. The model was introduced by Gersch and Knollman in 1963 in the context of granular superconductors. (The term 'Bose' in its name refers to the fact that the particles in the system are bosonic.) The model rose to prominence in the 1980s after it was found to capture the essence of the superfluid-insulator transition in a way that was much more mathematically tractable than fermionic metal-insulator models.

The Bose–Hubbard model can be used to describe physical systems such as bosonic atoms in an optical lattice, as well as certain magnetic insulators. Furthermore, it can be generalized and applied to Bose–Fermi mixtures, in which case the corresponding Hamiltonian is called the Bose–Fermi–Hubbard Hamiltonian.

== Hamiltonian ==
The physics of this model is given by the Bose–Hubbard Hamiltonian:

$$H = -t \sum_{ \left\langle i, j \right\rangle } \left( \hat{b}^{\dagger}_i \hat{b}_j + \hat{b}^{\dagger}_j \hat{b}_i \right) + \frac{U}{2} \sum_{i} \hat{n}_i \left( \hat{n}_i - 1 \right) - \mu \sum_i \hat{n}_i.$$

Here, $\left\langle i, j \right\rangle$ denotes summation over all neighboring lattice sites $i$ and $j$, while $\hat{b}^{\dagger}_i$ and $\hat{b}^{}_i$ are bosonic creation and annihilation operators such that $\hat{n}_i = \hat{b}^{\dagger}_i \hat{b}_i$ gives the number of particles on site $i$. The model is parametrized by the hopping amplitude $t$ that describes boson mobility in the lattice, the on-site interaction $U$ which can be attractive ($U < 0$) or repulsive ($U > 0$), and the chemical potential $\mu$, which essentially sets the number of particles. If unspecified, typically the phrase 'Bose–Hubbard model' refers to the case where the on-site interaction is repulsive.

This Hamiltonian has a global $U(1)$ symmetry, which means that it is invariant (its physical properties are unchanged) by the transformation $\hat{b}_i \rightarrow e^{i \theta} \hat{b}_i$. In a superfluid phase, this symmetry is spontaneously broken.

=== Hilbert space ===
The dimension of the Hilbert space of the Bose–Hubbard model is given by the number of ways to distribute $N_b$ indistinguishable balls into $L$ distinguishable bins, $D_{b}= \tbinom{N_{b}+L-1}{L-1} = (N_{b}+L-1)!/N_{b}!(L-1)!$, where $N_{b}$ is the total number of particles, while $L$ denotes the total number of lattice sites. At fixed $N_b$ or $L$, the Hilbert space dimension $D_b$ grows polynomially, but at a fixed density of $n_b$ bosons per site, it grows exponentially as $D_b \sim \left[ (1 + n_b) \left( 1 + \frac{1}{n_b} \right)^{n_b} \right]^L$. Analogous Hamiltonians may be formulated to describe spinless fermions (the Fermi-Hubbard model) or mixtures of different atom species (Bose–Fermi mixtures, for example). In the case of a mixture, the Hilbert space is simply the tensor product of the Hilbert spaces of the individual species. Typically additional terms are included to model interaction between species.

== Phase diagram ==
At zero temperature, the Bose–Hubbard model (in the absence of disorder) is in either a Mott insulating state at small $t / U$, or in a superfluid state at large $t / U$. The Mott insulating phases are characterized by integer boson densities, by the existence of an energy gap for particle-hole excitations, and by zero compressibility. The superfluid is characterized by long-range phase coherence, a spontaneous breaking of the Hamiltonian's continuous $U(1)$ symmetry, a non-zero compressibility and superfluid susceptibility. At non-zero temperature, in certain parameter regimes a regular fluid phase appears that does not break the $U(1)$ symmetry and does not display phase coherence. Both of these phases have been experimentally observed in ultracold atomic gases.

In the presence of disorder, a third, "Bose glass" phase exists. The Bose glass is a Griffiths phase, and can be thought of as a Mott insulator containing rare 'puddles' of superfluid. These superfluid pools are not interconnected, so the system remains insulating, but their presence significantly changes model thermodynamics. The Bose glass phase is characterized by finite compressibility, the absence of a gap, and by an infinite superfluid susceptibility. It is insulating despite the absence of a gap, as low tunneling prevents the generation of excitations which, although close in energy, are spatially separated. The Bose glass has a non-zero Edwards–Anderson order parameter and has been suggested (but not proven) to display replica symmetry breaking.

== Mean-field theory ==
The phases of the clean Bose–Hubbard model can be described using a mean-field Hamiltonian:
$$\begin{align}
H_{\textrm{MF}}&=\sum_i \left[ -\mu \hat{n}_i +\frac{U}{2} \hat{n}_i(\hat{n}_i-1)-zt(\psi^{*} \hat{b}_i +\psi\hat{b}^{\dagger}_i)+zt\psi^{*}\psi \right]
\end{align}$$
where $z$ is the lattice co-ordination number. This can be obtained from the full Bose–Hubbard Hamiltonian by setting $\hat{b}_{i} \rightarrow \psi+\delta \hat{b}$ where $\psi=\langle \hat{b}_{i} \rangle$, neglecting terms quadratic in $\delta \hat{b}_{i}$ (assumedly infinitesimal) and relabelling $\delta \hat{b}_{i} \rightarrow \hat{b}_{i}$. Because this decoupling breaks the $U(1)$ symmetry of the initial Hamiltonian for all non-zero values of $\psi$, this parameter acts as a superfluid order parameter. For simplicity, this decoupling assumes $\psi$ to be the same on every site, which precludes exotic phases such as supersolids or other inhomogeneous phases. (Other decouplings are possible.) The phase diagram can be determined by calculating the energy of this mean-field Hamiltonian using second-order perturbation theory and finding the condition for which $\psi \neq 0$. To do this, the Hamiltonian is written as a site-local piece plus a perturbation:
$$H_{\textrm{MF}}=\sum_{i}\left[ h^{(0)}_{i}-zt(\psi^{*} \hat{b}_i +\psi\hat{b}^{\dagger}_i) \right] \quad \textrm{with} \quad h^{(0)}_i=-\mu \hat{n}_i +\frac{U}{2} \hat{n}_i(\hat{n}_i-1)+zt\psi^{*}\psi$$
where the bilinear terms $\psi^{*}\hat{b}_i$ and its conjugate are treated as the perturbation. The order parameter $\psi$ is assumed to be small near the phase transition. The local term is diagonal in the Fock basis, giving the zeroth-order energy contribution:
$$E^{(0)}_m=-\mu m + \frac{U}{2}m(m-1)+zt |\psi|^{2}$$
where $m$ is an integer that labels the filling of the Fock state. The perturbative piece can be treated with second-order perturbation theory, which leads to:
$$E^{(2)}_m=zt |\psi|^2 \sum_{n \neq m} \frac{|\langle m|(\hat{b}_{i}^{\dagger}+\hat{b}_{i})|n \rangle|^2}{E^{(0)}_n-E^{(0)}_m}
=-(zt)^2 |\psi|^{2} \left( \frac{m}{U(m-1)-\mu} + \frac{m+1}{\mu-U m} \right).$$
The energy can be expressed as a series expansion in even powers of the order parameter (also known as the Landau formalism):
$$E=\text{constant} + R |\psi|^2 + W |\psi|^4 +...$$
After doing so, the condition for the mean-field, second-order phase transition between the Mott insulator and the superfluid phase is given by:
$$r=\frac{R}{zt}=1+zt \left( \frac{m}{U(m-1)-\mu} + \frac{m+1}{\mu-U m} \right)=0$$
where the integer $m$ describes the filling of the $m^{th}$ Mott insulating lobe. Plotting the line $r=0$ for different integer values of $m$ generates the boundary of the different Mott lobes, as shown in the phase diagram.

== Implementation in optical lattices ==
Ultracold atoms in optical lattices are considered a standard realization of the Bose–Hubbard model. The ability to tune model parameters using simple experimental techniques and the lack of the lattice dynamics that are present in solid-state electronic systems mean that ultracold atoms offer a clean, controllable realisation of the Bose–Hubbard model. The biggest downside with optical lattice technology is the trap lifetime, with atoms typically trapped for only a few tens of seconds.

To see why ultracold atoms offer such a convenient realization of Bose–Hubbard physics, the Bose–Hubbard Hamiltonian can be derived starting from the second quantized Hamiltonian that describes a gas of ultracold atoms in the optical lattice potential. This Hamiltonian is given by:

$$H= \int {\rm d}^3 r \! \left[ \hat\psi^\dagger(\vec r) \left ( -\frac{\hbar^2}{2m} \nabla^2 +V_{\rm latt.}(\vec r) \right) \hat\psi(\vec r)
+ \frac{g}{2}\hat \psi^\dagger(\vec r)\hat\psi^\dagger(\vec r)\hat\psi(\vec r)\hat\psi(\vec r) - \mu \hat{\psi}^\dagger(\vec r)\hat\psi(\vec r)\right]$$,

where $V_{latt}$ is the optical lattice potential, $g$ is the (contact) interaction amplitude, and $\mu$ is the chemical potential. The tight binding approximation results in the substitution $\hat\psi(\vec r) = \sum\limits_i w_i^\alpha (\vec r) b_i^\alpha$, which leads to the Bose–Hubbard Hamiltonian the physics are restricted to the lowest band ($\alpha=0$) and the interactions are local at the level of the discrete mode. Mathematically, this can be stated as the requirement that $\int w_i^\alpha(\vec r)w_j^\beta(\vec r)w_k^\gamma(r)w_l^\delta(\vec r)\,{\rm d}^3 r=0$ except for case $i=j=k=l \wedge \alpha=\beta=\gamma=\delta=0$. Here, $w_i^\alpha(\vec r)$ is a Wannier function for a particle in an optical lattice potential localized around site $i$ of the lattice and for the $\alpha$th Bloch band.

=== Subtleties and approximations ===
The tight-binding approximation significantly simplifies the second quantized Hamiltonian, though it introduces several limitations at the same time:

- For single-site states with several particles in a single state, the interactions may couple to higher Bloch bands, which contradicts base assumptions. Still, a single band model is able to address low-energy physics of such a setting but with parameters U and J becoming density-dependent. Instead of one parameter U, the interaction energy of n particles may be described by $U_n$ close, but not equal to U.
- When considering (fast) lattice dynamics, additional terms are added to the Hamiltonian so that the time-dependent Schrödinger equation is obeyed in the (time-dependent) Wannier function basis. The terms come from the Wannier functions' time dependence. Otherwise, the lattice dynamics may be incorporated by making the key parameters of the model time-dependent, varying with the instantaneous value of the optical potential.

== Experimental results ==
Quantum phase transitions in the Bose–Hubbard model were experimentally observed by Greiner et al., and density dependent interaction parameters $U_n$ were observed by Immanuel Bloch's group. Single-atom resolution imaging of the Bose–Hubbard model has been possible since 2009 using quantum gas microscopes.

== Further applications ==
The Bose–Hubbard model is of interest in the field of quantum computation and quantum information. Entanglement of ultra-cold atoms can be studied using this model.

== Numerical simulation ==
In the calculation of low energy states the term proportional to $n^2 U$ means that large occupation of a single site is improbable, allowing for truncation of local Hilbert space to states containing at most $d <\infty$ particles. Then the local Hilbert space dimension is $d+1.$ The dimension of the full Hilbert space grows exponentially with the number of lattice sites, limiting exact computer simulations of the entire Hilbert space to systems of 15-20 particles in 15-20 lattice sites. Experimental systems contain several million sites, with average filling above unity.

One-dimensional lattices may be studied using density matrix renormalization group (DMRG) and related techniques such as time-evolving block decimation (TEBD). This includes calculating the ground state of the Hamiltonian for systems of thousands of particles on thousands of lattice sites, and simulating its dynamics governed by the time-dependent Schrödinger equation. Recently, two dimensional lattices have been studied using projected entangled pair states, a generalization of matrix product states in higher dimensions, both for the ground state and finite temperature.

Higher dimensions are significantly more difficult due to the rapid growth of entanglement.

All dimensions may be treated by quantum Monte Carlo algorithms, which provide a way to study properties of the Hamiltonian's thermal states, and in particular the ground state.

== Generalizations ==
Bose–Hubbard-like Hamiltonians may be derived for different physical systems containing ultracold atom gas in the periodic potential. They include:

- systems with longer-ranged density-density interactions of the form $V n_i n_j$, which may stabilise a supersolid phase for certain parameter values
- dimerised magnets, where spin-1/2 electrons are bound together in pairs called dimers that have bosonic excitation statistics and are described by a Bose–Hubbard model
- long-range dipolar interaction
- systems with interaction-induced tunneling terms $a_i^\dagger ( n_i + n_j ) a_j$
- internal spin structure of atoms, for example due to trapping an entire degenerate manifold of hyperfine spin states (for F=1 it leads to the spin-1 Bose–Hubbard model)
- situations where the gas experiences an additional potential—for example, in disordered systems. The disorder might be realised by a speckle pattern, or using a second, incommensurate, weaker, optical lattice. In the latter case inclusion of the disorder amounts to including extra term of the form: $H_I=V_d \sum\limits_i \cos(k i+\varphi) \hat{n}_i$.

== See also ==
- Jaynes–Cummings–Hubbard model
