= List of character tables for chemically important 3D point groups =

This lists the character tables for the more common molecular point groups used in the study of molecular symmetry. These tables are based on the group-theoretical treatment of the symmetry operations present in common molecules, and are useful in molecular spectroscopy and quantum chemistry. Information regarding the use of the tables, as well as more extensive lists of them, can be found in the references.

== Notation ==
For each non-linear group, the tables give the most standard notation of the finite group isomorphic to the point group, followed by the order of the group (number of invariant symmetry operations). The finite group notation used is: Z_{n}: cyclic group of order n, D_{n}: dihedral group isomorphic to the symmetry group of an n–sided regular polygon, S_{n}: symmetric group on n letters, and A_{n}: alternating group on n letters.

The character tables then follow for all groups. The rows of the character tables correspond to the irreducible representations of the group, with their conventional names, known as Mulliken symbols, in the left margin. The naming conventions are as follows:

- A and B are singly degenerate representations, with the former transforming symmetrically around the principal axis of the group, and the latter asymmetrically. E, T, G, H, ... are doubly, triply, quadruply, quintuply, ... degenerate representations.
- g and u subscripts denote symmetry and antisymmetry, respectively, with respect to a center of inversion. Subscripts "1" and "2" denote symmetry and antisymmetry, respectively, with respect to a nonprincipal rotation axis. Higher numbers denote additional representations with such asymmetry.
- Single prime ( ' ) and double prime ( '' ) superscripts denote symmetry and antisymmetry, respectively, with respect to a horizontal mirror plane σ_{h}, one perpendicular to the principal rotation axis.

All but the two rightmost columns correspond to the symmetry operations which are invariant in the group. In the case of sets of similar operations with the same characters for all representations, they are presented as one column, with the number of such similar operations noted in the heading.

The body of the tables contain the characters in the respective irreducible representations for each respective symmetry operation, or set of symmetry operations. The symbol i used in the body of the table denotes the imaginary unit: i^{2} = −1. Used in a column heading, it denotes the operation of inversion. A superscripted uppercase "C" denotes complex conjugation.

The two rightmost columns indicate which irreducible representations describe the symmetry transformations of the three Cartesian coordinates (x, y and z), rotations about those three coordinates (R_{x}, R_{y} and R_{z}), and functions of the quadratic terms of the coordinates(x^{2}, y^{2}, z^{2}, xy, xz, and yz).

A further column is included in some tables, such as those of Salthouse and Ware For example,

$C_s$	$E$	$\sigma_h$			
$A'$	$1$	$1$	$x$, $y$, $R_z$	$x^2$, $y^2$, $z^2$, $xy$	$zx^2$, $yz^2$, $x^2y$, $xy^2$, $x^3$, $y^3$
$A''$	$1$	$-1$	$z$, $R_x$, $R_y$	$yz$, $xz$	$z^3$, $xyz$, $y^2z$, $x^2z$

The last column relates to cubic functions which may be used in applications regarding f orbitals in atoms.

== Character tables ==
=== Nonaxial symmetries ===
These groups are characterized by a lack of a proper rotation axis, noting that a $C_1$ rotation is considered the identity operation. These groups have involutional symmetry: the only nonidentity operation, if any, is its own inverse.

In the group $C_1$, all functions of the Cartesian coordinates and rotations about them transform as the $A$ irreducible representation.

Point Group	Canonical Group	Order	Character Table
$C_1$	$Z_1$	$1$	/ $E$; $A$ / $1$
$C_i$	$Z_2$	2	/ $E$ / $i$; $A_g$ / $1$ / $1$ / $R_x$, $R_y$, $R_z$ / $x^2$, $y^2$, $z^2$, $xy$, $xz$, $yz$; $A_u$ / $1$ / $-1$ / $x$, $y$, $z$
$C_s$	$Z_2$	$2$	/ $E$ / $\sigma_h$; $A'$ / $1$ / $1$ / $x$, $y$, $R_z$ / $x^2$, $y^2$, $z^2$, $xy$; $A''$ / $1$ / $-1$ / $z$, $R_x$, $R_y$ / $yz$, $xz$

=== Cyclic symmetries ===
The families of groups with these symmetries have only one rotation axis.

==== Cyclic groups (C_{n}) ====
The cyclic groups are denoted by C_{n}. These groups are characterized by an n-fold proper rotation axis C_{n}. The C_{1} group is covered in the nonaxial groups section.

Point Group	Canonical Group	Order	Character Table
C_{2}	Z_{2}	2	/ E / C_{2}; A / 1 / 1 / R_{z}, z / x^{2}, y^{2}, z^{2}, xy; B / 1 / −1 / R_{x}, R_{y}, x, y / xz, yz
C_{3}	Z_{3}	3	/ E / C_{3} / C_{3}^{2} / θ = e^{2πi /3}; A / 1 / 1 / 1 / R_{z}, z / x^{2} + y^{2}; E / 1; 1 / θ θ^{C} / θ^{C} θ / (R_{x}, R_{y}), (x, y) / (x^{2} - y^{2}, xy), (xz, yz)
C_{4}	Z_{4}	4	/ E / C_{4} / C_{2} / C_{4}^{3}; A / 1 / 1 / 1 / 1 / R_{z}, z / x^{2} + y^{2}, z^{2}; B / 1 / −1 / 1 / −1 / / x^{2} − y^{2}, xy; E / 1; 1 / i −i / −1 −1 / −i i / (R_{x}, R_{y}), (x, y) / (xz, yz)
C_{5}	Z_{5}	5	/ E / C_{5} / C_{5}^{2} / C_{5}^{3} / C_{5}^{4} / θ = e^{2πi /5}; A / 1 / 1 / 1 / 1 / 1 / R_{z}, z / x^{2} + y^{2}, z^{2}; E_{1} / 1; 1 / θ θ^{C} / θ^{2} (θ^{2})^{C} / (θ^{2})^{C} θ^{2} / θ^{C} θ / (R_{x}, R_{y}), (x, y) / (xz, yz); E_{2} / 1; 1 / θ^{2} (θ^{2})^{C} / θ^{C} θ / θ θ^{C} / (θ^{2})^{C} θ^{2} / / (x^{2} - y^{2}, xy)
C_{6}	Z_{6}	6	/ E / C_{6} / C_{3} / C_{2} / C_{3}^{2} / C_{6}^{5} / θ = e^{2πi /6}; A / 1 / 1 / 1 / 1 / 1 / 1 / R_{z}, z / x^{2} + y^{2}, z^{2}; B / 1 / −1 / 1 / −1 / 1 / −1; E_{1} / 1; 1 / θ θ^{C} / −θ^{C} −θ / −1 −1 / −θ −θ^{C} / θ^{C} −θ / (R_{x}, R_{y}), (x, y) / (xz, yz); E_{2} / 1; 1 / −θ^{C} −θ / −θ −θ^{C} / 1; 1 / −θ^{C} −θ / −θ −θ^{C} / / (x^{2} − y^{2}, xy)
C_{8}	Z_{8}	8	/ E / C_{8} / C_{4} / C_{8}^{3} / C_{2} / C_{8}^{5} / C_{4}^{3} / C_{8}^{7} / θ = e^{2πi /8}; A / 1 / 1 / 1 / 1 / 1 / 1 / 1 / 1 / R_{z}, z / x^{2} + y^{2}, z^{2}; B / 1 / −1 / 1 / −1 / 1 / −1 / 1 / −1; E_{1} / 1; 1 / θ θ^{C} / i −i / −θ^{C} −θ / −1 −1 / −θ −θ^{C} / −i i / θ^{C} θ / (R_{x}, R_{y}), (x, y) / (xz, yz); E_{2} / 1; 1 / i −i / −1 −1 / −i i / 1; 1 / i −i / −1 −1 / −i i / / (x^{2} − y^{2}, xy); E_{3} / 1; 1 / −θ −θ^{C} / i −i / θ^{C} θ / −1 −1 / θ θ^{C} / −i i / −θ^{C} −θ

==== Reflection groups (C_{nh}) ====
The reflection groups are denoted by C_{nh}. These groups are characterized by i) an n-fold proper rotation axis C_{n}; ii) a mirror plane σ_{h} normal to C_{n}. The C_{1h} group is the same as the C_{s} group in the nonaxial groups section.

Point Group	Canonical group	Order	Character Table
C_{2h}	Z_{2} × Z_{2}	4	/ E / C_{2} / i / σ_{h}; A_{g} / 1 / 1 / 1 / 1 / R_{z} / x^{2}, y^{2}, z^{2}, xy; B_{g} / 1 / −1 / 1 / −1 / R_{x}, R_{y} / xz, yz; A_{u} / 1 / 1 / −1 / −1 / z; B_{u} / 1 / −1 / −1 / 1 / x, y
C_{3h}	Z_{6}	6	/ E / C_{3} / C_{3}^{2} / σ_{h} / S_{3} / S_{3}^{5} / θ = e^{2πi /3}; A' / 1 / 1 / 1 / 1 / 1 / 1 / R_{z} / x^{2} + y^{2}, z^{2}; E' / 1; 1 / θ θ^{C} / θ^{C} θ / 1; 1 / θ θ^{C} / θ^{C} θ / (x, y) / (x^{2} − y^{2}, xy); A'' / 1 / 1 / 1 / −1 / −1 / −1 / z; E'' / 1; 1 / θ θ^{C} / θ^{C} θ / −1 −1 / −θ −θ^{C} / −θ^{C} −θ / (R_{x}, R_{y}) / (xz, yz)
C_{4h}	Z_{2} × Z_{4}	8	/ E / C_{4} / C_{2} / C_{4}^{3} / i / S_{4}^{3} / σ_{h} / S_{4}; A_{g} / 1 / 1 / 1 / 1 / 1 / 1 / 1 / 1 / R_{z} / x^{2} + y^{2}, z^{2}; B_{g} / 1 / −1 / 1 / −1 / 1 / −1 / 1 / −1 / / x^{2} − y^{2}, xy; E_{g} / 1; 1 / i −i / −1 −1 / −i i / 1; 1 / i −i / −1 −1 / −i i / (R_{x}, R_{y}) / (xz, yz); A_{u} / 1 / 1 / 1 / 1 / −1 / −1 / −1 / −1 / z; B_{u} / 1 / −1 / 1 / −1 / −1 / 1 / −1 / 1; E_{u} / 1; 1 / i −i / −1 −1 / −i i / −1 −1 / −i i / 1; 1 / i −i / (x, y)
C_{5h}	Z_{10}	10	/ E / C_{5} / C_{5}^{2} / C_{5}^{3} / C_{5}^{4} / σ_{h} / S_{5} / S_{5}^{7} / S_{5}^{3} / S_{5}^{9} / θ = e^{2πi /5}; A' / 1 / 1 / 1 / 1 / 1 / 1 / 1 / 1 / 1 / 1 / R_{z} / x^{2} + y^{2}, z^{2}; E_{1}' / 1; 1 / θ θ^{C} / θ^{2} (θ^{2})^{C} / (θ^{2})^{C} θ^{2} / θ^{C} θ / 1; 1 / θ θ^{C} / θ^{2} (θ^{2})^{C} / (θ^{2})^{C} θ^{2} / θ^{C} θ / (x, y); E_{2}' / 1; 1 / θ^{2} (θ^{2})^{C} / θ^{C} θ / θ θ^{C} / (θ^{2})^{C} θ^{2} / 1; 1 / θ^{2} (θ^{2})^{C} / θ^{C} θ / θ θ^{C} / (θ^{2})^{C} θ^{2} / / (x^{2} - y^{2}, xy); A'' / 1 / 1 / 1 / 1 / 1 / −1 / −1 / −1 / −1 / −1 / z; E_{1}'' / 1; 1 / θ θ^{C} / θ^{2} (θ^{2})^{C} / (θ^{2})^{C} θ^{2} / θ^{C} θ / −1 −1 / −θ -θ^{C} / −θ^{2} −(θ^{2})^{C} / −(θ^{2})^{C} −θ^{2} / −θ^{C} −θ / (R_{x}, R_{y}) / (xz, yz); E_{2}'' / 1; 1 / θ^{2} (θ^{2})^{C} / θ^{C} θ / θ θ^{C} / (θ^{2})^{C} θ^{2} / −1 −1 / −θ^{2} −(θ^{2})^{C} / −θ^{C} −θ / −θ −θ^{C} / −(θ^{2})^{C} −θ^{2}
C_{6h}	Z_{2} × Z_{6}	12	/ E / C_{6} / C_{3} / C_{2} / C_{3}^{2} / C_{6}^{5} / i / S_{3}^{5} / S_{6}^{5} / σ_{h} / S_{6} / S_{3} / θ = e^{2πi /6}; A_{g} / 1 / 1 / 1 / 1 / 1 / 1 / 1 / 1 / 1 / 1 / 1 / 1 / R_{z} / x^{2} + y^{2}, z^{2}; B_{g} / 1 / −1 / 1 / −1 / 1 / −1 / 1 / −1 / 1 / −1 / 1 / −1; E_{1g} / 1; 1 / θ θ^{C} / −θ^{C} −θ / −1 −1 / −θ −θ^{C} / θ^{C} θ / 1; 1 / θ θ^{C} / −θ^{C} −θ / −1 −1 / −θ −θ^{C} / θ^{C} θ / (R_{x}, R_{y}) / (xz, yz); E_{2g} / 1; 1 / −θ^{C} −θ / −θ −θ^{C} / 1; 1 / −θ^{C} −θ / −θ −θ^{C} / 1; 1 / −θ^{C} −θ / −θ −θ^{C} / 1; 1 / −θ^{C} −θ / −θ −θ^{C} / / (x^{2} − y^{2}, xy); A_{u} / 1 / 1 / 1 / 1 / 1 / 1 / −1 / −1 / −1 / −1 / −1 / −1 / z; B_{u} / 1 / −1 / 1 / −1 / 1 / −1 / −1 / 1 / −1 / 1 / −1 / 1; E_{1u} / 1; 1 / θ θ^{C} / −θ^{C} −θ / −1 −1 / −θ −θ^{C} / θ^{C} θ / −1 −1 / −θ −θ^{C} / θ^{C} θ / 1; 1 / θ θ^{C} / −θ^{C} −θ / (x, y); E_{2u} / 1; 1 / −θ^{C} −θ / −θ −θ^{C} / 1; 1 / −θ^{C} −θ / −θ −θ^{C} / −1 −1 / θ^{C} θ / θ θ^{C} / −1 −1 / θ^{C} θ / θ θ^{C}

==== Pyramidal groups (C_{nv}) ====
The pyramidal groups are denoted by C_{nv}. These groups are characterized by i) an n-fold proper rotation axis C_{n}; ii) n mirror planes σ_{v} which contain C_{n}. The C_{1v} group is the same as the C_{s} group in the nonaxial groups section.

Point Group	Canonical group	Order	Character Table
C_{2v}	Z_{2} × Z_{2} (=D_{2})	4	/ E / C_{2} / σ_{v} / σ_{v}'; A_{1} / 1 / 1 / 1 / 1 / z / x^{2} , y^{2}, z^{2}; A_{2} / 1 / 1 / −1 / −1 / R_{z} / xy; B_{1} / 1 / −1 / 1 / −1 / R_{y}, x / xz; B_{2} / 1 / −1 / −1 / 1 / R_{x}, y / yz
C_{3v}	D_{3}	6	/ E / 2 C_{3} / 3 σ_{v}; A_{1} / 1 / 1 / 1 / z / x^{2} + y^{2}, z^{2}; A_{2} / 1 / 1 / −1 / R_{z}; E / 2 / −1 / 0 / (R_{x}, R_{y}), (x, y) / (x^{2} − y^{2}, xy), (xz, yz)
C_{4v}	D_{4}	8	/ E / 2 C_{4} / C_{2} / 2 σ_{v} / 2 σ_{d}; A_{1} / 1 / 1 / 1 / 1 / 1 / z / x^{2} + y^{2}, z^{2}; A_{2} / 1 / 1 / 1 / −1 / −1 / R_{z}; B_{1} / 1 / −1 / 1 / 1 / −1 / / x^{2} − y^{2}; B_{2} / 1 / −1 / 1 / −1 / 1 / / xy; E / 2 / 0 / −2 / 0 / 0 / (R_{x}, R_{y}), (x, y) / (xz, yz)
C_{5v}	D_{5}	10	/ E / 2 C_{5} / 2 C_{5}^{2} / 5 σ_{v} / θ = 2π/5; A_{1} / 1 / 1 / 1 / 1 / z / x^{2} + y^{2}, z^{2}; A_{2} / 1 / 1 / 1 / −1 / R_{z}; E_{1} / 2 / 2 cos(θ) / 2 cos(2θ) / 0 / (R_{x}, R_{y}), (x, y) / (xz, yz); E_{2} / 2 / 2 cos(2θ) / 2 cos(θ) / 0 / / (x^{2} − y^{2}, xy)
C_{6v}	D_{6}	12	/ E / 2 C_{6} / 2 C_{3} / C_{2} / 3 σ_{v} / 3 σ_{d}; A_{1} / 1 / 1 / 1 / 1 / 1 / 1 / z / x^{2} + y^{2}, z^{2}; A_{2} / 1 / 1 / 1 / 1 / −1 / −1 / R_{z}; B_{1} / 1 / −1 / 1 / −1 / 1 / −1; B_{2} / 1 / −1 / 1 / −1 / −1 / 1; E_{1} / 2 / 1 / −1 / −2 / 0 / 0 / (R_{x}, R_{y}), (x, y) / (xz, yz); E_{2} / 2 / −1 / −1 / 2 / 0 / 0 / / (x^{2} − y^{2}, xy)

==== Improper rotation groups (S_{n}) ====
The improper rotation groups are denoted by S_{n}. These groups are characterized by an n-fold improper rotation axis S_{n}, where n is necessarily even. The S_{2} group is the same as the C_{i} group in the nonaxial groups section. S_{n} groups with an odd value of n are identical to C_{nh} groups of same n and are therefore not considered here (in particular, S_{1} is identical to C_{s}).

The S_{8} table reflects the 2007 discovery of errors in older references. Specifically, (R_{x}, R_{y}) transform not as E_{1} but rather as E_{3}.

Point Group	Canonical group	Order	Character Table
S_{4}	Z_{4}	4	/ E / S_{4} / C_{2} / S_{4}^{3}; A / 1 / 1 / 1 / 1 / R_{z}, / x^{2} + y^{2}, z^{2}; B / 1 / −1 / 1 / −1 / z / x^{2} − y^{2}, xy; E / 1; 1 / i −i / −1 −1 / −i i / (R_{x}, R_{y}), (x, y) / (xz, yz)
S_{6}	Z_{6}	6	/ E / S_{6} / C_{3} / i / C_{3}^{2} / S_{6}^{5} / θ = e^{2πi /6}; A_{g} / 1 / 1 / 1 / 1 / 1 / 1 / R_{z} / x^{2} + y^{2}, z^{2}; E_{g} / 1; 1 / θ^{C} θ / θ θ^{C} / 1; 1 / θ^{C} θ / θ θ^{C} / (R_{x}, R_{y}) / (x^{2} − y^{2}, xy), (xz, yz); A_{u} / 1 / −1 / 1 / −1 / 1 / −1 / z; E_{u} / 1; 1 / −θ^{C} −θ / θ θ^{C} / −1 −1 / θ^{C} θ / −θ −θ^{C} / (x, y)
S_{8}	Z_{8}	8	/ E / S_{8} / C_{4} / S_{8}^{3} / C_{2} / S_{8}^{5} / C_{4}^{2} / S_{8}^{7} / θ = e^{2πi /8}; A / 1 / 1 / 1 / 1 / 1 / 1 / 1 / 1 / R_{z} / x^{2} + y^{2}, z^{2}; B / 1 / −1 / 1 / −1 / −1 / −1 / 1 / −1 / z; E_{1} / 1; 1 / θ θ^{C} / i −i / −θ^{C} −θ / −1 −1 / −θ −θ^{C} / −i i / θ^{C} θ / (x, y) / (xz, yz); E_{2} / 1; 1 / i −i / −1 −1 / −i i / 1; 1 / i −i / −1 −1 / −i i / / (x^{2} − y^{2}, xy); E_{3} / 1; 1 / −θ^{C} −θ / −i i / θ θ^{C} / −1 −1 / θ^{C} θ / i −i / −θ −θ^{C} / (R_{x}, R_{y}) / (xz, yz)

=== Dihedral symmetries ===
The families of groups with these symmetries are characterized by 2-fold proper rotation axes normal to a principal rotation axis.

==== Dihedral groups (D_{n}) ====
The dihedral groups are denoted by D_{n}. These groups are characterized by i) an n-fold proper rotation axis C_{n}; ii) n 2-fold proper rotation axes C_{2} normal to C_{n}. The D_{1} group is the same as the C_{2} group in the cyclic groups section.

Point Group	Canonical group	Order	Character Table
D_{2}	Z_{2} × Z_{2} (=D_{2})	4	/ E / C_{2} (z) / C_{2} (x) / C_{2} (y); A / 1 / 1 / 1 / 1 / / x^{2}, y^{2}, z^{2}; B_{1} / 1 / 1 / −1 / −1 / R_{z}, z / xy; B_{2} / 1 / −1 / −1 / 1 / R_{y}, y / xz; B_{3} / 1 / −1 / 1 / −1 / R_{x}, x / yz
D_{3}	D_{3}	6	/ E / 2 C_{3} / 3 C'_{2}; A_{1} / 1 / 1 / 1 / / x^{2} + y^{2}, z^{2}; A_{2} / 1 / 1 / −1 / R_{z}, z; E / 2 / −1 / 0 / (R_{x}, R_{y}), (x, y) / (x^{2} − y^{2}, xy), (xz, yz)
D_{4}	D_{4}	8	/ E / 2 C_{4} / C_{2} / 2 C_{2}' / 2 C_{2}''; A_{1} / 1 / 1 / 1 / 1 / 1 / / x^{2} + y^{2}, z^{2}; A_{2} / 1 / 1 / 1 / −1 / −1 / R_{z}, z; B_{1} / 1 / −1 / 1 / 1 / −1 / / x^{2} − y^{2}; B_{2} / 1 / −1 / 1 / −1 / 1 / / xy; E / 2 / 0 / −2 / 0 / 0 / (R_{x}, R_{y}), (x, y) / (xz, yz)
D_{5}	D_{5}	10	/ E / 2 C_{5} / 2 C_{5}^{2} / 5 C_{2} / θ=2π/5; A_{1} / 1 / 1 / 1 / 1 / / x^{2} + y^{2}, z^{2}; A_{2} / 1 / 1 / 1 / −1 / R_{z}, z; E_{1} / 2 / 2 cos(θ) / 2 cos(2θ) / 0 / (R_{x}, R_{y}), (x, y) / (xz, yz); E_{2} / 2 / 2 cos(2θ) / 2 cos(θ) / 0 / / (x^{2} − y^{2}, xy)
D_{6}	D_{6}	12	/ E / 2 C_{6} / 2 C_{3} / C_{2} / 3 C_{2}' / 3 C_{2}''; A_{1} / 1 / 1 / 1 / 1 / 1 / 1 / / x^{2} + y^{2}, z^{2}; A_{2} / 1 / 1 / 1 / 1 / −1 / −1 / R_{z}, z; B_{1} / 1 / −1 / 1 / −1 / 1 / −1; B_{2} / 1 / −1 / 1 / −1 / −1 / 1; E_{1} / 2 / 1 / −1 / −2 / 0 / 0 / (R_{x}, R_{y}), (x, y) / (xz, yz); E_{2} / 2 / −1 / −1 / 2 / 0 / 0 / / (x^{2} − y^{2}, xy)

==== Prismatic groups (D_{nh}) ====
The prismatic groups are denoted by D_{nh}. These groups are characterized by i) an n-fold proper rotation axis C_{n}; ii) n 2-fold proper rotation axes C_{2} normal to C_{n}; iii) a mirror plane σ_{h} normal to C_{n} and containing the C_{2}s. The D_{1h} group is the same as the C_{2v} group in the pyramidal groups section.

The D_{8h} table reflects the 2007 discovery of errors in older references. Specifically, symmetry operation column headers 2S_{8} and 2S_{8}^{3} were reversed in the older references.

Point Group	Canonical group	Order	Character Table
D_{2h}	Z_{2}×Z_{2}×Z_{2} (=Z_{2}×D_{2})	8	/ E / C_{2} / C_{2} (x) / C_{2} (y) / i / σ(xy) / σ(xz) / σ(yz); A_{g} / 1 / 1 / 1 / 1 / 1 / 1 / 1 / 1 / / x^{2}, y^{2}, z^{2}; B_{1g} / 1 / 1 / −1 / −1 / 1 / 1 / −1 / −1 / R_{z} / xy; B_{2g} / 1 / −1 / −1 / 1 / 1 / −1 / 1 / −1 / R_{y} / xz; B_{3g} / 1 / −1 / 1 / −1 / 1 / −1 / −1 / 1 / R_{x} / yz; A_{u} / 1 / 1 / 1 / 1 / −1 / −1 / −1 / −1; B_{1u} / 1 / 1 / −1 / −1 / −1 / −1 / 1 / 1 / z; B_{2u} / 1 / −1 / −1 / 1 / −1 / 1 / −1 / 1 / y; B_{3u} / 1 / −1 / 1 / −1 / −1 / 1 / 1 / −1 / x
D_{3h}	D_{6}	12	/ E / 2 C_{3} / 3 C_{2} / σ_{h} / 2 S_{3} / 3 σ_{v}; A_{1}' / 1 / 1 / 1 / 1 / 1 / 1 / / x^{2} + y^{2}, z^{2}; A_{2}' / 1 / 1 / −1 / 1 / 1 / −1 / R_{z}; E' / 2 / −1 / 0 / 2 / −1 / 0 / (x, y) / (x^{2} − y^{2}, xy); A_{1}'' / 1 / 1 / 1 / −1 / −1 / −1; A_{2}'' / 1 / 1 / −1 / −1 / −1 / 1 / z; E'' / 2 / −1 / 0 / −2 / 1 / 0 / (R_{x}, R_{y}) / (xz, yz)
D_{4h}	Z_{2}×D_{4}	16	/ E / 2 C_{4} / C_{2} / 2 C_{2}' / 2 C_{2}'' / i / 2 S_{4} / σ_{h} / 2 σ_{v} / 2 σ_{d}; A_{1g} / 1 / 1 / 1 / 1 / 1 / 1 / 1 / 1 / 1 / 1 / / x^{2} + y^{2}, z^{2}; A_{2g} / 1 / 1 / 1 / −1 / −1 / 1 / 1 / 1 / −1 / −1 / R_{z}; B_{1g} / 1 / −1 / 1 / 1 / −1 / 1 / −1 / 1 / 1 / −1 / / x^{2} − y^{2}; B_{2g} / 1 / −1 / 1 / −1 / 1 / 1 / −1 / 1 / −1 / 1 / / xy; E_{g} / 2 / 0 / −2 / 0 / 0 / 2 / 0 / −2 / 0 / 0 / (R_{x}, R_{y}) / (xz, yz); A_{1u} / 1 / 1 / 1 / 1 / 1 / −1 / −1 / −1 / −1 / −1; A_{2u} / 1 / 1 / 1 / −1 / −1 / −1 / −1 / −1 / 1 / 1 / z; B_{1u} / 1 / −1 / 1 / 1 / −1 / −1 / 1 / −1 / −1 / 1; B_{2u} / 1 / −1 / 1 / −1 / 1 / −1 / 1 / −1 / 1 / −1; E_{u} / 2 / 0 / −2 / 0 / 0 / −2 / 0 / 2 / 0 / 0 / (x, y)
D_{5h}	D_{10}	20	/ E / 2 C_{5} / 2 C_{5}^{2} / 5 C_{2} / σ_{h} / 2 S_{5} / 2 S_{5}^{3} / 5 σ_{v} / θ=2π/5; A_{1}' / 1 / 1 / 1 / 1 / 1 / 1 / 1 / 1 / / x^{2} + y^{2}, z^{2}; A_{2}' / 1 / 1 / 1 / −1 / 1 / 1 / 1 / −1 / R_{z}; E_{1}' / 2 / 2 cos(θ) / 2 cos(2θ) / 0 / 2 / 2 cos(θ) / 2 cos(2θ) / 0 / (x, y); E_{2}' / 2 / 2 cos(2θ) / 2 cos(θ) / 0 / 2 / 2 cos(2θ) / 2 cos(θ) / 0 / / (x^{2} − y^{2}, xy); A_{1}'' / 1 / 1 / 1 / 1 / −1 / −1 / −1 / −1; A_{2}'' / 1 / 1 / 1 / −1 / −1 / −1 / −1 / 1 / z; E_{1}'' / 2 / 2 cos(θ) / 2 cos(2θ) / 0 / −2 / −2 cos(θ) / −2 cos(2θ) / 0 / (R_{x}, R_{y}) / (xz, yz); E_{2}'' / 2 / 2 cos(2θ) / 2 cos(θ) / 0 / −2 / −2 cos(2θ) / −2 cos(θ) / 0
D_{6h}	Z_{2}×D_{6}	24	/ E / 2 C_{6} / 2 C_{3} / C_{2} / 3 C_{2}' / 3 C_{2}'' / i / 2 S_{3} / 2 S_{6} / σ_{h} / 3 σ_{d} / 3 σ_{v}; A_{1g} / 1 / 1 / 1 / 1 / 1 / 1 / 1 / 1 / 1 / 1 / 1 / 1 / / x^{2} + y^{2}, z^{2}; A_{2g} / 1 / 1 / 1 / 1 / −1 / −1 / 1 / 1 / 1 / 1 / −1 / −1 / R_{z}; B_{1g} / 1 / −1 / 1 / −1 / 1 / −1 / 1 / −1 / 1 / −1 / 1 / −1; B_{2g} / 1 / −1 / 1 / −1 / −1 / 1 / 1 / −1 / 1 / −1 / −1 / 1; E_{1g} / 2 / 1 / −1 / −2 / 0 / 0 / 2 / 1 / −1 / −2 / 0 / 0 / (R_{x}, R_{y}) / (xz, yz); E_{2g} / 2 / −1 / −1 / 2 / 0 / 0 / 2 / −1 / −1 / 2 / 0 / 0 / / (x^{2} − y^{2}, xy); A_{1u} / 1 / 1 / 1 / 1 / 1 / 1 / −1 / −1 / −1 / −1 / −1 / −1; A_{2u} / 1 / 1 / 1 / 1 / −1 / −1 / −1 / −1 / −1 / −1 / 1 / 1 / z; B_{1u} / 1 / −1 / 1 / −1 / 1 / −1 / −1 / 1 / −1 / 1 / −1 / 1; B_{2u} / 1 / −1 / 1 / −1 / −1 / 1 / −1 / 1 / −1 / 1 / 1 / −1; E_{1u} / 2 / 1 / −1 / −2 / 0 / 0 / −2 / −1 / 1 / 2 / 0 / 0 / (x, y); E_{2u} / 2 / −1 / −1 / 2 / 0 / 0 / −2 / 1 / 1 / −2 / 0 / 0
D_{8h}	Z_{2}×D_{8}	32	/ E / 2 C_{8} / 2 C_{8}^{3} / 2 C_{4} / C_{2} / 4 C_{2}' / 4 C_{2}'' / i / 2 S_{8}^{3} / 2 S_{8} / 2 S_{4} / σ_{h} / 4 σ_{d} / 4 σ_{v} / θ=2^{1/2}; A_{1g} / 1 / 1 / 1 / 1 / 1 / 1 / 1 / 1 / 1 / 1 / 1 / 1 / 1 / 1 / / x^{2} + y^{2}, z^{2}; A_{2g} / 1 / 1 / 1 / 1 / 1 / −1 / −1 / 1 / 1 / 1 / 1 / 1 / −1 / −1 / R_{z}; B_{1g} / 1 / −1 / −1 / 1 / 1 / 1 / −1 / 1 / −1 / −1 / 1 / 1 / 1 / −1; B_{2g} / 1 / −1 / −1 / 1 / 1 / −1 / 1 / 1 / −1 / −1 / 1 / 1 / −1 / 1; E_{1g} / 2 / θ / −θ / 0 / −2 / 0 / 0 / 2 / θ / −θ / 0 / −2 / 0 / 0 / (R_{x}, R_{y}) / (xz, yz); E_{2g} / 2 / 0 / 0 / −2 / 2 / 0 / 0 / 2 / 0 / 0 / −2 / 2 / 0 / 0 / / (x^{2} − y^{2}, xy); E_{3g} / 2 / −θ / θ / 0 / −2 / 0 / 0 / 2 / −θ / θ / 0 / −2 / 0 / 0; A_{1u} / 1 / 1 / 1 / 1 / 1 / 1 / 1 / −1 / −1 / −1 / −1 / −1 / −1 / −1; A_{2u} / 1 / 1 / 1 / 1 / 1 / −1 / −1 / −1 / −1 / −1 / −1 / −1 / 1 / 1 / z; B_{1u} / 1 / −1 / −1 / 1 / 1 / 1 / −1 / −1 / 1 / 1 / −1 / −1 / −1 / 1; B_{2u} / 1 / −1 / −1 / 1 / 1 / −1 / 1 / −1 / 1 / 1 / −1 / −1 / 1 / −1; E_{1u} / 2 / θ / −θ / 0 / −2 / 0 / 0 / −2 / −θ / θ / 0 / 2 / 0 / 0 / (x, y); E_{2u} / 2 / 0 / 0 / −2 / 2 / 0 / 0 / −2 / 0 / 0 / 2 / −2 / 0 / 0; E_{3u} / 2 / −θ / θ / 0 / −2 / 0 / 0 / −2 / θ / −θ / 0 / 2 / 0 / 0

==== Antiprismatic groups (D_{nd}) ====
The antiprismatic groups are denoted by D_{nd}. These groups are characterized by i) an n-fold proper rotation axis C_{n}; ii) n 2-fold proper rotation axes C_{2} normal to C_{n}; iii) n mirror planes σ_{d} which contain C_{n}. The D_{1d} group is the same as the C_{2h} group in the reflection groups section.

Point Group	Canonical group	Order	Character Table
D_{2d}	D_{4}	8	/ E / 2 S_{4} / C_{2} / 2 C_{2}' / 2 σ_{d}; A_{1} / 1 / 1 / 1 / 1 / 1 / / x^{2}, y^{2}, z^{2}; A_{2} / 1 / 1 / 1 / −1 / −1 / R_{z}; B_{1} / 1 / −1 / 1 / 1 / −1 / / x^{2} − y^{2}; B_{2} / 1 / −1 / 1 / −1 / 1 / z / xy; E / 2 / 0 / −2 / 0 / 0 / (R_{x}, R_{y}), (x, y) / (xz, yz)
D_{3d}	D_{6}	12	/ E / 2 C_{3} / 3 C_{2} / i / 2 S_{6} / 3 σ_{d}; A_{1g} / 1 / 1 / 1 / 1 / 1 / 1 / / x^{2} + y^{2}, z^{2}; A_{2g} / 1 / 1 / −1 / 1 / 1 / −1 / R_{z}; E_{g} / 2 / −1 / 0 / 2 / −1 / 0 / (R_{x}, R_{y}) / (x^{2} − y^{2}, xy), (xz, yz); A_{1u} / 1 / 1 / 1 / −1 / −1 / −1; A_{2u} / 1 / 1 / −1 / −1 / −1 / 1 / z; E_{u} / 2 / −1 / 0 / −2 / 1 / 0 / (x, y)
D_{4d}	D_{8}	16	/ E / 2 S_{8} / 2 C_{4} / 2 S_{8}^{3} / C_{2} / 4 C_{2}' / 4 σ_{d} / θ=2^{1/2}; A_{1} / 1 / 1 / 1 / 1 / 1 / 1 / 1 / / x^{2} + y^{2}, z^{2}; A_{2} / 1 / 1 / 1 / 1 / 1 / −1 / −1 / R_{z}; B_{1} / 1 / −1 / 1 / −1 / 1 / 1 / −1; B_{2} / 1 / −1 / 1 / −1 / 1 / −1 / 1 / z; E_{1} / 2 / θ / 0 / −θ / −2 / 0 / 0 / (x, y); E_{2} / 2 / 0 / −2 / 0 / 2 / 0 / 0 / / (x^{2} − y^{2}, xy); E_{3} / 2 / −θ / 0 / θ / −2 / 0 / 0 / (R_{x}, R_{y}) / (xz, yz)
D_{5d}	D_{10}	20	/ E / 2 C_{5} / 2 C_{5}^{2} / 5 C_{2} / i / 2 S_{10} / 2 S_{10}^{3} / 5 σ_{d} / θ=2π/5; A_{1g} / 1 / 1 / 1 / 1 / 1 / 1 / 1 / 1 / / x^{2} + y^{2}, z^{2}; A_{2g} / 1 / 1 / 1 / −1 / 1 / 1 / 1 / −1 / R_{z}; E_{1g} / 2 / 2 cos(θ) / 2 cos(2θ) / 0 / 2 / 2 cos(2θ) / 2 cos(θ) / 0 / (R_{x}, R_{y}) / (xz, yz); E_{2g} / 2 / 2 cos(2θ) / 2 cos(θ) / 0 / 2 / 2 cos(θ) / 2 cos(2θ) / 0 / / (x^{2} − y^{2}, xy); A_{1u} / 1 / 1 / 1 / 1 / −1 / −1 / −1 / −1; A_{2u} / 1 / 1 / 1 / −1 / −1 / −1 / −1 / 1 / z; E_{1u} / 2 / 2 cos(θ) / 2 cos(2θ) / 0 / −2 / −2 cos(2θ) / −2 cos(θ) / 0 / (x, y); E_{2u} / 2 / 2 cos(2θ) / 2 cos(θ) / 0 / −2 / −2 cos(θ) / −2 cos(2θ) / 0
D_{6d}	D_{12}	24	/ E / 2 S_{12} / 2 C_{6} / 2 S_{4} / 2 C_{3} / 2 S_{12}^{5} / C_{2} / 6 C_{2}' / 6 σ_{d} / θ=3^{1/2}; A_{1} / 1 / 1 / 1 / 1 / 1 / 1 / 1 / 1 / 1 / / x^{2} + y^{2}, z^{2}; A_{2} / 1 / 1 / 1 / 1 / 1 / 1 / 1 / −1 / −1 / R_{z}; B_{1} / 1 / −1 / 1 / −1 / 1 / −1 / 1 / 1 / −1; B_{2} / 1 / −1 / 1 / −1 / 1 / −1 / 1 / −1 / 1 / z; E_{1} / 2 / θ / 1 / 0 / −1 / −θ / −2 / 0 / 0 / (x, y); E_{2} / 2 / 1 / −1 / −2 / −1 / 1 / 2 / 0 / 0 / / (x^{2} − y^{2}, xy); E_{3} / 2 / 0 / −2 / 0 / 2 / 0 / −2 / 0 / 0; E_{4} / 2 / −1 / −1 / 2 / −1 / −1 / 2 / 0 / 0; E_{5} / 2 / −θ / 1 / 0 / −1 / θ / −2 / 0 / 0 / (R_{x}, R_{y}) / (xz, yz)

=== Polyhedral symmetries ===
These symmetries are characterized by having more than one proper rotation axis of order greater than 2.

==== Cubic groups ====
These polyhedral groups are characterized by not having a C_{5} proper rotation axis.

Point Group	Canonical group	Order	Character Table
T	A_{4}	12	/ E / 4 C_{3} / 4 C_{3}^{2} / 3 C_{2} / θ=e^{2π i/3}; A / 1 / 1 / 1 / 1 / / x^{2} + y^{2} + z^{2}; E / 1; 1 / θ θ^{C} / θ^{C} θ / 1; 1 / / (2 z^{2} − x^{2} − y^{2}, x^{2} − y^{2}); T / 3 / 0 / 0 / −1 / (R_{x}, R_{y}, R_{z}), (x, y, z) / (xy, xz, yz)
T_{d}	S_{4}	24	/ E / 8 C_{3} / 3 C_{2} / 6 S_{4} / 6 σ_{d}; A_{1} / 1 / 1 / 1 / 1 / 1 / / x^{2} + y^{2} + z^{2}; A_{2} / 1 / 1 / 1 / −1 / −1; E / 2 / −1 / 2 / 0 / 0 / / (2 z^{2} − x^{2} − y^{2}, x^{2} − y^{2}); T_{1} / 3 / 0 / −1 / 1 / −1 / (R_{x}, R_{y}, R_{z}); T_{2} / 3 / 0 / −1 / −1 / 1 / (x, y, z) / (xy, xz, yz)
T_{h}	Z_{2}×A_{4}	24	/ E / 4 C_{3} / 4 C_{3}^{2} / 3 C_{2} / i / 4 S_{6} / 4 S_{6}^{5} / 3 σ_{h} / θ=e^{2π i/3}; A_{g} / 1 / 1 / 1 / 1 / 1 / 1 / 1 / 1 / / x^{2} + y^{2} + z^{2}; A_{u} / 1 / 1 / 1 / 1 / −1 / −1 / −1 / −1; E_{g} / 1; 1 / θ θ^{C} / θ^{C} θ / 1; 1 / 1; 1 / θ θ^{C} / θ^{C} θ / 1; 1 / / (2 z^{2} − x^{2} − y^{2}, x^{2} − y^{2}); E_{u} / 1; 1 / θ θ^{C} / θ^{C} θ / 1; 1 / −1 −1 / −θ −θ^{C} / −θ^{C} −θ / −1 −1; T_{g} / 3 / 0 / 0 / −1 / 3 / 0 / 0 / −1 / (R_{x}, R_{y}, R_{z}) / (xy, xz, yz); T_{u} / 3 / 0 / 0 / −1 / −3 / 0 / 0 / 1 / (x, y, z)
O	S_{4}	24	/ E / 6 C_{4} / 3 C_{2} (C_{4}^{2}) / 8 C_{3} / 6 C'_{2}; A_{1} / 1 / 1 / 1 / 1 / 1 / / x^{2} + y^{2} + z^{2}; A_{2} / 1 / −1 / 1 / 1 / −1; E / 2 / 0 / 2 / −1 / 0 / / (2 z^{2} − x^{2} − y^{2}, x^{2} − y^{2}); T_{1} / 3 / 1 / −1 / 0 / −1 / (R_{x}, R_{y}, R_{z}), (x, y, z); T_{2} / 3 / −1 / −1 / 0 / 1 / / (xy, xz, yz)
O_{h}	Z_{2}×S_{4}	48	/ E / 8 C_{3} / 6 C_{2} / 6 C_{4} / 3 C_{2} (C_{4}^{2}) / i / 6 S_{4} / 8 S_{6} / 3 σ_{h} / 6 σ_{d}; A_{1g} / 1 / 1 / 1 / 1 / 1 / 1 / 1 / 1 / 1 / 1 / / x^{2} + y^{2} + z^{2}; A_{2g} / 1 / 1 / −1 / −1 / 1 / 1 / −1 / 1 / 1 / −1; E_{g} / 2 / −1 / 0 / 0 / 2 / 2 / 0 / −1 / 2 / 0 / / (2 z^{2} − x^{2} − y^{2}, x^{2} − y^{2}); T_{1g} / 3 / 0 / −1 / 1 / −1 / 3 / 1 / 0 / −1 / −1 / (R_{x}, R_{y}, R_{z}); T_{2g} / 3 / 0 / 1 / −1 / −1 / 3 / −1 / 0 / −1 / 1 / / (xy, xz, yz); A_{1u} / 1 / 1 / 1 / 1 / 1 / −1 / −1 / −1 / −1 / −1; A_{2u} / 1 / 1 / −1 / −1 / 1 / −1 / 1 / −1 / −1 / 1; E_{u} / 2 / −1 / 0 / 0 / 2 / −2 / 0 / 1 / −2 / 0; T_{1u} / 3 / 0 / −1 / 1 / −1 / −3 / −1 / 0 / 1 / 1 / (x, y, z); T_{2u} / 3 / 0 / 1 / −1 / −1 / −3 / 1 / 0 / 1 / −1

==== Icosahedral groups ====
These polyhedral groups are characterized by having a C_{5} proper rotation axis.

Point
Group
Canonical
group
Order
Character Table
I
A_{5}
60

	E	12 C_{5}	12 C_{5}^{2}	20 C_{3}	15 C_{2}	θ=π/5	
A	1	1	1	1	1		x^{2} + y^{2} + z^{2}
T_{1}	3	2 cos(θ)	2 cos(3θ)	0	−1	(R_{x}, R_{y}, R_{z}), (x, y, z)	
T_{2}	3	2 cos(3θ)	2 cos(θ)	0	−1		
G	4	−1	−1	1	0		
H	5	0	0	−1	1		(2 z^{2} − x^{2} − y^{2}, x^{2} − y^{2}, xy, xz, yz)

I_{h}
Z_{2}×A_{5}
120

	E	12 C_{5}	12 C_{5}^{2}	20 C_{3}	15 C_{2}	i	12 S_{10}	12 S_{10}^{3}	20 S_{6}	15 σ	θ=π/5	
A_{g}	1	1	1	1	1	1	1	1	1	1		x^{2} + y^{2} + z^{2}
T_{1g}	3	2 cos(θ)	2 cos(3θ)	0	−1	3	2 cos(3θ)	2 cos(θ)	0	−1	(R_{x}, R_{y}, R_{z})	
T_{2g}	3	2 cos(3θ)	2 cos(θ)	0	−1	3	2 cos(θ)	2 cos(3θ)	0	−1		
G_{g}	4	−1	−1	1	0	4	−1	−1	1	0		
H_{g}	5	0	0	−1	1	5	0	0	−1	1		(2 z^{2} − x^{2} − y^{2}, x^{2} − y^{2}, xy, xz, yz)
A_{u}	1	1	1	1	1	−1	−1	−1	−1	−1		
T_{1u}	3	2 cos(θ)	2 cos(3θ)	0	−1	−3	−2 cos(3θ)	−2 cos(θ)	0	1	(x, y, z)	
T_{2u}	3	2 cos(3θ)	2 cos(θ)	0	−1	−3	−2 cos(θ)	−2 cos(3θ)	0	1		
G_{u}	4	−1	−1	1	0	−4	1	1	−1	0		
H_{u}	5	0	0	−1	1	−5	0	0	1	−1		

=== Linear (cylindrical) groups ===
These groups are characterized by having a proper rotation axis C_{∞} around which the symmetry is invariant to any rotation.

Point
Group
Character Table
C_{∞v}

	E	2 C_{∞}^{Φ}	...	∞ σ_{v}		
A_{1}=Σ^{+}	1	1	...	1	z	x^{2} + y^{2}, z^{2}
A_{2}=Σ^{−}	1	1	...	−1	R_{z}	
E_{1}=Π	2	2 cos(Φ)	...	0	(x, y), (R_{x}, R_{y})	(xz, yz)
E_{2}=Δ	2	2 cos(2Φ)	...	0		(x^{2} - y^{2}, xy)
E_{3}=Φ	2	2 cos(3Φ)	...	0		
...	...	...	...	...		

D_{∞h}

	E	2 C_{∞}^{Φ}	...	∞ σ_{v}	i	2 S_{∞}^{Φ}	...	∞ C_{2}		
Σ_{g}^{+}	1	1	...	1	1	1	...	1		x^{2} + y^{2}, z^{2}
Σ_{g}^{−}	1	1	...	−1	1	1	...	−1	R_{z}	
Π_{g}	2	2 cos(Φ)	...	0	2	−2 cos(Φ)	..	0	(R_{x}, R_{y})	(xz, yz)
Δ_{g}	2	2 cos(2Φ)	...	0	2	2 cos(2Φ)	..	0		(x^{2} − y^{2}, xy)
...	...	...	...	...	...	...	...	...		
Σ_{u}^{+}	1	1	...	1	−1	−1	...	−1	z	
Σ_{u}^{−}	1	1	...	−1	−1	−1	...	1		
Π_{u}	2	2 cos(Φ)	...	0	−2	2 cos(Φ)	..	0	(x, y)	
Δ_{u}	2	2 cos(2Φ)	...	0	−2	−2 cos(2Φ)	..	0		
...	...	...	...	...	...	...	...	...		

== See also ==
- Linear combination of atomic orbitals (molecular orbital method)
- Raman spectroscopy
- Vibrational spectroscopy (molecular vibration)
- List of small groups
- Cubic harmonics
