= Metal–insulator transition =

Change between conductive and non-conductive state

Metal–insulator transitions are transitions of a material from a metal (material with good electrical conductivity of electric charges) to an insulator (material where conductivity of charges is quickly suppressed). These transitions can be achieved by tuning various ambient parameters such as temperature, pressure or, in case of a semiconductor, doping.

== History ==
The basic distinction between metals and insulators was proposed by Hans Bethe, Arnold Sommerfeld and Felix Bloch in 1928-1929. It distinguished between conducting metals (with partially filled bands) and nonconducting insulators. However, in 1937 Jan Hendrik de Boer and Evert Verwey reported that many transition-metal oxides (such as NiO) with a partially filled d-band were poor conductors, often insulating. In the same year, the importance of the electron-electron correlation was stated by Rudolf Peierls. Since then, these materials as well as others exhibiting a transition between a metal and an insulator have been extensively studied, e.g. by Sir Nevill Mott, after whom the insulating state is named Mott insulator.

The first metal-insulator transition to be found was the Verwey transition of magnetite in the 1940s.

== Theoretical description ==
The classical band structure of solid state physics predicts the Fermi level to lie in a band gap for insulators and in the conduction band for metals, which means metallic behavior is seen for compounds with partially filled bands. However, some compounds have been found which show insulating behavior even for partially filled bands. This is due to the electron-electron correlation, since electrons cannot be seen as noninteracting. Mott considers a lattice model with just one electron per site. Without taking the interaction into account, each site could be occupied by two electrons, one with spin up and one with spin down. Due to the interaction the electrons would then feel a strong Coulomb repulsion, which Mott argued splits the band in two. Having one electron per-site fills the lower band while the upper band remains empty, which suggests the system becomes an insulator. This interaction-driven insulating state is referred to as a Mott insulator. The Hubbard model is one simple model commonly used to describe metal-insulator transitions and the formation of a Mott insulator.

== Elementary mechanisms ==
Metal–insulator transitions (MIT) and models for approximating them can be classified based on the origin of their transition.

- Mott transition: The most common transition, arising from intense electron-electron correlation.
- Mott-Hubbard transition: An extension incorporating the Hubbard model, approaching the transition from the correlated paramagnetic state.
- Brinkman-Rice transition: Approaching the transition from the non-interacting metallic state, where each orbital is half-filled.
- Dynamical mean-field theory: A theory that accommodates both Mott-Hubbard and Brinkman-Rice models of the transition.
- Peierls transition: On some occasions, the lattice itself through electron-phonon interactions can give rise to a transition. An example of a Peierls insulator is the blue bronze K_{0.3}MoO_{3}, which undergoes transition at T = 180 K.
- Anderson transition: When an insulator behavior in metals arises from distortions and lattice defects.

== Polarization catastrophe ==
The polarization catastrophe model, also called the dielectric catastrophe model, describes the transition of a material from an insulator to a metal. This model considers the electrons in a solid to act as oscillators and the conditions for this transition to occur is determined by the number of oscillators per unit volume of the material. Since every oscillator has a frequency (ω_{0}) we can describe the dielectric function of a solid as,

$$\epsilon(\omega)= 1+\frac{\frac{Ne^2}{\epsilon_{0}m}}{\omega_0^2-\frac{Ne^2}{3\epsilon_0m} -\omega^2-i\frac\omega\tau}$$

where ε(ω) is the dielectric function, N is the number of oscillators per unit volume, ω_{0} is the fundamental oscillation frequency, m is the oscillator mass, and ω is the excitation frequency.

For a material to be a metal, the excitation frequency (ω) must be zero by definition, which then gives us the static dielectric constant,

$\epsilon_{\mathrm s} = 1+\frac{\frac{Ne^2}{\epsilon_0m}}{\omega_0^2-\frac{Ne^2}{3\epsilon_0m}}$	1

where ε_{s} is the static dielectric constant. If we rearrange equation (1) to isolate the number of oscillators per unit volume we get the critical concentration of oscillators (N_{c}) at which ε_{s} becomes infinite, indicating a metallic solid and the transition from an insulator to a metal.

$$N_{\mathrm c} = \frac{3\epsilon_0 m \omega_0^2}{e^2}$$

This expression creates a boundary that defines the transition of a material from an insulator to a metal. This phenomenon is known as the polarization catastrophe.

The polarization catastrophe model also theorizes that, with a high enough density, and thus a low enough molar volume, any solid could become metallic in character. Predicting whether a material will be metallic or insulating can be done by taking the ratio R/V, where R is the molar refractivity, sometimes represented by A, and V is the molar volume. In cases where R/V is less than 1, the material will have non-metallic, or insulating properties, while an R/V value greater than one yields metallic character. This inequality is known as the Goldhammer–Herzfeld criterion, or sometimes just the Herzfeld criterion, after Karl Herzfeld and Dmitrii A. Goldhammer.

== See also ==
- Superconductor–insulator transition – Type of quantum phase transition
- Aubry–André model – Toy model for electronic localization
- Metallization pressure – Pressure at which a metal–insulator transition occurs
