= Charge-transfer insulators =

Nonmetal due to charge transfer between atoms

A comparison between charge-transfer and Mott-Hubbard insulator band structures: a cuprate vs a nickelate.

Charge-transfer insulators are a class of materials predicted to be conductors following conventional band theory, but which are in fact insulators due to a charge-transfer process. Unlike in Mott insulators, where the insulating properties arise from electrons hopping between unit cells, the electrons in charge-transfer insulators move between atoms within the unit cell. In the Mott–Hubbard case, it's easier for electrons to transfer between two adjacent metal sites (on-site Coulomb interaction U); here we have an excitation corresponding to the Coulomb energy U with

$d^nd^n \rightarrow d^{n-1}d^{n+1}, \quad \Delta E = U = U_{dd}$.

In the charge-transfer case, the excitation happens from the anion (e.g., oxygen) p level to the metal d level with the charge-transfer energy Δ:

$d^np^6 \rightarrow d^{n+1}p^{5}, \quad \Delta E = \Delta_{CT}$.

U is determined by repulsive/exchange effects between the cation valence electrons. Δ is tuned by the chemistry between the cation and anion. One important difference is the creation of an oxygen p hole, corresponding to the change from a 'normal' $\ce{O^2-}$ to the ionic $\ce{O-}$ state. In this case the ligand hole is often denoted as $\underline{L}$.

Distinguishing between Mott-Hubbard and charge-transfer insulators can be done using the Zaanen-Sawatzky-Allen (ZSA) scheme.

== Exchange interaction ==
Analogous to Mott insulators we also have to consider superexchange in charge-transfer insulators. One contribution is similar to the Mott case: the hopping of a d electron from one transition metal site to another and then back the same way. This process can be written as

$d^n_ip^6d^n_j \rightarrow d^n_ip^5d^{n+1}_j \rightarrow d^{n-1}_ip^6d^{n+1}_j \rightarrow d^n_ip^5d^{n+1}_j \rightarrow d^n_ip^6d^n_j$.

This will result in an antiferromagnetic exchange (for nondegenerate d levels) with an exchange constant $J = J_{dd}$.

$J_{dd} = \frac{2t^2_{dd}}{U_{dd}} = \cfrac{2t^4_{pd}}{\Delta_{CT}^2U_{dd}}$

In the charge-transfer insulator case

$d^n_i p^6d^n_j \rightarrow d^n_i p^5d^{n+1}_j \rightarrow d^{n+1}_i p^4d^{n+1}_j \rightarrow d^{n+1}_i p^5d^n_j \rightarrow d^n_i p^6d^n_j$.

This process also yields an antiferromagnetic exchange $J_{pd}$:

$J_{pd} = \cfrac{4t^4_{pd}}{\Delta^2_{CT}\cdot\left(2\Delta_{CT}+U_{pp}\right)}$

The difference between these two possibilities is the intermediate state, which has one ligand hole for the first exchange ($p^6\rightarrow p^5$) and two for the second ($p^6\rightarrow p^4$).

The total exchange energy is the sum of both contributions:

$J_{total} = \cfrac{2t^4_{pd}}{\Delta^2_{CT}} \cdot \left(\cfrac{1}{U_{dd}} + \cfrac{1}{\Delta_{CT} + \tfrac{1}{2}U_{pp}}\right)$.

Depending on the ratio of $U_{dd}\text{ and } \left(\Delta_{CT}+\tfrac{1}{2}U_{pp}\right)$, the process is dominated by one of the terms and thus the resulting state is either Mott-Hubbard or charge-transfer insulating.
