= Mott insulator =

Electrical insulators that are conventionally expected to be conductors

Mott insulators are a class of materials that are expected to conduct electricity according to conventional band theories, but are actually insulators (particularly at low temperatures). These insulators fail to be correctly described by band theories of solids due to their strong electron–electron interactions, which are not considered in conventional band theory. A Mott transition is a transition from a metal to an insulator, driven by the strong interactions between electrons. One of the simplest models that can capture Mott transition is the Hubbard model.

The band gap in a Mott insulator exists between bands of like character, such as 3d electron bands, whereas the band gap in charge-transfer insulators exists between anion and cation states.

== History ==
Although the band theory of solids had been very successful in describing various electrical properties of materials, in 1937 Jan Hendrik de Boer and Evert Johannes Willem Verwey pointed out that a variety of transition metal oxides predicted to be conductors by band theory are insulators. With an odd number of electrons per unit cell, the valence band is only partially filled, so the Fermi level lies within the band. From the band theory, this implies that such a material has to be a metal. This conclusion fails for several cases, e.g. CoO, one of the strongest insulators known.

Nevill Mott and Rudolf Peierls also in 1937 predicted the failing of band theory can be explained by including interactions between electrons.

In 1949, in particular, Mott proposed a model for NiO as an insulator, where conduction is based on the formula

(Ni^{2+}O^{2−})_{2} → Ni^{3+}O^{2−} + Ni^{1+}O^{2−}.

In this situation, the formation of an energy gap preventing conduction can be understood as the competition between the Coulomb potential U between 3d electrons and the transfer integral t of 3d electrons between neighboring atoms (the transfer integral is a part of the tight binding approximation). The total energy gap is then

E_{gap} = U − 2zt,

where z is the number of nearest-neighbor atoms.

In general, Mott insulators occur when the repulsive Coulomb potential U is large enough to create an energy gap. One of the simplest theories of Mott insulators is the 1963 Hubbard model. The crossover from a metal to a Mott insulator as U is increased, can be predicted within the dynamical mean field theory.

Mott reviewed the subject in 1968. The subject has been thoroughly reviewed in a comprehensive paper by Masatoshi Imada, Atsushi Fujimori, and Yoshinori Tokura. A recent proposal of a "Griffiths-like phase close to the Mott transition" has been reported in the literature.

== Mott criterion ==
The Mott criterion describes the critical point of the metal–insulator transition. The criterion is

$n^{-1/3} < C a_0^* ,$

where $n$ is the electron density of the material and $a_0^*$ the effective bohr radius. The constant $C$, according to various estimates, is 2.0, 2.78,4.0, or 4.2.

If the criterion is satisfied (i.e. if the density of electrons is sufficiently high) the material becomes conductive (metal) and otherwise it will be an insulator.

== Mottness ==
Mottism denotes the additional component, aside from antiferromagnetic ordering, which is necessary to fully describe a Mott insulator. Thus, mottism accounts for all of the properties of Mott insulators that cannot be attributed simply to antiferromagnetism. There are a number of properties of Mott insulators, derived from both experimental and theoretical observations, which cannot be attributed to antiferromagnetic ordering and thus constitute mottism. These properties include:

- Spectral weight transfer on the Mott scale
- Vanishing of the single particle Green function along a connected surface in momentum space in the first Brillouin zone
- Two sign changes of the Hall coefficient as electron doping goes from $n=0$ to $n=2$ (band insulators have only one sign change at $n=1$)
- The presence of a charge $2e$ (with $e<0$ the charge of an electron) boson at low energies
- A pseudogap away from half-filling ($n=1$)

== Mott transition ==
A Mott transition is a metal-insulator transition in condensed matter. Due to electric field screening the potential energy becomes much more sharply (exponentially) peaked around the equilibrium position of the atom and electrons become localized and can no longer conduct a current. It is named after physicist Nevill Francis Mott.

== Conceptual explanation ==
In a semiconductor at low temperatures, each 'site' (atom or group of atoms) contains a certain number of electrons and is electrically neutral. For an electron to move away from a site, it requires a certain amount of energy, as the electron is normally pulled back toward the (now positively charged) site by Coulomb forces. If the temperature is high enough that $\tfrac 1 2 k_{\mathrm B} T$ of energy is available per site, the Boltzmann distribution predicts that a significant fraction of electrons will have enough energy to escape their site, leaving an electron hole behind and becoming conduction electrons that conduct current. The result is that at low temperatures a material is insulating, and at high temperatures the material conducts.

While the conduction in an n- (p-) type doped semiconductor sets in at high temperatures because the conduction (valence) band is partially filled with electrons (holes) with the original band structure being unchanged, the situation is different in the case of the Mott transition where the band structure itself changes. Mott argued that the transition must be sudden, occurring when the density of free electrons N and the Bohr radius $a_0$ satisfies $N^{1/3} a_0 \simeq 0.2$.

Simply put, a Mott transition is a change in a material's behavior from insulating to metallic due to various factors. This transition is known to exist in various systems: mercury metal vapor-liquid, metal NH_{3} solutions, transition metal chalcogenides and transition metal oxides. In the case of transition metal oxides, the material typically switches from being a good electrical insulator to a good electrical conductor. The insulator-metal transition can also be modified by changes in temperature, pressure or composition (doping). As observed by Nevill Francis Mott in his 1949 publication on Ni-oxide, the origin of this behavior is correlations between electrons and the close relationship this phenomenon has to magnetism.

The physical origin of the Mott transition is the interplay between the Coulomb repulsion of electrons and their degree of localization (band width). Once the carrier density becomes too high (e.g. due to doping), the energy of the system can be lowered by the localization of the formerly conducting electrons (band width reduction), leading to the formation of a band gap, e.g. by pressure (i.e. a semiconductor/insulator).

In a semiconductor, the doping level also affects the Mott transition. It has been observed that higher dopant concentrations in a semiconductor creates internal stresses that increase the free energy (acting as a change in pressure) of the system, thus reducing the ionization energy.

The reduced barrier causes easier transfer by tunneling or by thermal emission from donor to its adjacent donor. The effect is enhanced when pressure is applied for the reason stated previously. When the transport of carriers overcomes a minimum activation energy, the semiconductor has undergone a Mott transition and become metallic.

The Mott transition is usually first order, and involves discontinuous changes of physical properties. Theoretical studies of the Mott transition in the limit of large dimension find a first order transition. However in low dimensions and when the lattice geometry leads to frustration of magnetic ordering, it may be only weakly first order or even continuous (i.e second order). Weakly first order Mott transitions are seen in some quasi-two dimensional organic materials. Continuous Mott transitions have been reported in semiconductor moire materials. A theory of a continuous Mott transition is available if the Mott insulating phase is a quantum spin liquid with an emergent fermi surface of neutral fermions.

== Applications ==
Mott insulators are of growing interest in advanced physics research, and are not yet fully understood. They have applications in thin-film magnetic heterostructures and the strong correlated phenomena in high-temperature superconductivity, for example.

This kind of insulator can become a conductor by changing some parameters, which may be composition, pressure, strain, voltage, or magnetic field. The effect is known as a Mott transition and can be used to build smaller field-effect transistors, switches and memory devices than possible with conventional materials.

== See also ==
- Dynamical mean-field theory – Method to determine the electronic structure of strongly correlated materials
- Electronic band structure – Describes the range of energies of an electron within the solid
- Hubbard model – Simplified model in condensed matter physics
- Metal–insulator transition – Change between conductive and non-conductive state
- Tight binding – Model of electronic band structures of solids
- Variable-range hopping – Mechanism of electrical conduction in disordered materials (Mott)
