= Double-well potential =

Quartic potential in quantum mechanics

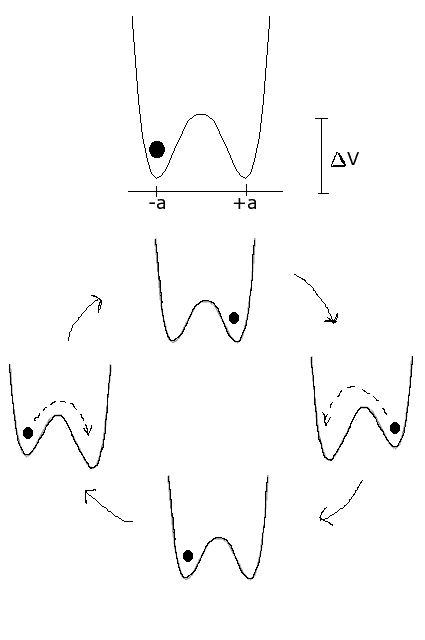
A double well potential with minima at positions -a and a. Particles can be on either side or switch from one side to the other (either by moving or by tunneling).

In quantum mechanics, the double-well potential is one of a number of quartic potentials for the exploration of various physical phenomena or mathematical properties since it permits in many cases explicit calculation without over-simplification.

Specifically symmetric double-well potential serves as a model to illustrate the concept of instantons as a pseudo-classical configuration in a Euclidean field theory. In the simpler quantum mechanical context this potential served as a model for the evaluation of path integrals. or the solution of the Schrödinger equation by various methods for the purpose of obtaining explicitly the energy eigenvalues.

The inverted symmetric double-well potential, on the other hand, served as a nontrivial potential in the Schrödinger equation for the calculation of decay rates and the exploration of the large order behavior of asymptotic expansions.

The third form of the quartic potential is that of a perturbed simple harmonic oscillator or pure anharmonic oscillator having a purely discrete energy spectrum.

The fourth type of possible quartic potential is that of asymmetric shape of one of the first two named above.

The double-well and other quartic potentials can be treated by a variety of methods—the main methods being (a) a perturbation method (that of Robert Balson Dingle and Harald J.W. Müller-Kirsten) which requires the imposition of boundary conditions, (b) the WKB method and (c) the path integral method. All cases are treated in detail in the book of Müller-Kirsten. The large order behavior of asymptotic expansions of Mathieu functions and their eigenvalues (also called characteristic numbers) has been derived in a further paper of Dingle and Müller-Kirsten.

== Symmetric double-well ==
The main interest in the literature has (for reasons related to field theory) focused on the symmetric double-well (potential), and there on the quantum mechanical ground state. Since tunneling through the central hump of the potential is involved, the calculation of the eigenenergies of the Schrödinger equation for this potential is nontrivial. The case of the ground state is mediated by pseudoclassical configurations known as instanton and anti-instanton. In explicit form these are hyperbolic functions. As pseudoclassical configurations these naturally appear in semiclassical considerations—the summation of (widely separated) instanton-anti-instanton pairs being known as the dilute gas approximation. The ground state eigenenergy finally obtained is an expression containing the exponential of the Euclidean action of the instanton. This is an expression containing the factor $1/\hbar$ and is therefore described as a (classically) nonperturbative effect.

The stability of the instanton configuration in the path integral theory of a scalar field theory with symmetric double-well self-interaction is investigated using the equation of small oscillations about the instanton. One finds that this equation is a Pöschl-Teller equation (i.e. a second order differential equation like the Schrödinger equation with Pöschl-Teller potential) with nonnegative eigenvalues. The nonnegativity of the eigenvalues is indicative of the stability of the instanton.

As stated above, the instanton is the pseudoparticle configuration defined on an infinite line of Euclidean time that communicates between the two wells of the potential and is responsible for the ground state of the system. The configurations correspondingly responsible for higher, i.e. excited, states are periodic instantons defined on a circle of Euclidean time which in explicit form are expressed in terms of Jacobian elliptic functions (the generalization of trigonometric functions). The evaluation of the path integral in these cases involves correspondingly elliptic integrals. The equation of small fluctuations about these periodic instantons is a Lamé equation whose solutions are Lamé functions. In cases of instability (as for the inverted double-well potential) this equation possesses negative eigenvalues indicative of this instability, i.e. decay.

Application of the perturbation method of Dingle and Müller (applied originally to the Mathieu equation, i.e. a Schrödinger equation with cosine potential) requires exploitation of parameter symmetries of the Schrödinger equation for the quartic potential. One expands around one of the two minima of the potential. In addition this method requires matching of different branches of solutions in domains of overlap. The application of boundary conditions finally yields (as in the case of the periodic potential) the nonperturbative effect.

In terms of parameters as in the Schrödinger equation for the symmetric double-well potential in the following form

$$\frac{d^2y(z)}{dz^2} + [E-V(z)]y(z) = 0, \;\;\;
V(z) = -\frac{1}{4}z^2h^4 + \frac{1}{2}c^2z^4, \;\; c^2>0, h^4>0,$$

the eigenvalues for $q_0=1,3,5,...$ are found to be (see book of Müller-Kirsten, formula (18.175b), p. 425)

$$E_{\pm}(q_0,h^2) = -\frac{h^8}{2^5c^2} + \frac{1}{\sqrt{2}}q_0h^2
-\frac{c^2(3q_0^2+1)}{2h^4} - \frac{\sqrt{2}c^4q_0}{8h^{10}}(17q_0^2+19) +O(\frac{1}{h^{16}})$$
$$\;\;\;     \mp \frac{2^{q_0+1}h^2(h^6/2c^2)^{q_0/2}}{\sqrt{\pi}2^{q_0/4}[(q_0-1)/2]!}e^{-h^6/6\sqrt{2}c^2}.$$

Clearly these eigenvalues are asymptotically ($h^2\rightarrow \infty$) degenerate as expected from the harmonic part of the potential. Observe that terms of the perturbative part of the result are alternately even or odd in $q_0$ and $h^2$ (as in corresponding results for Mathieu functions, Lamé functions, prolate spheroidal wave functions, oblate spheroidal wave functions and others).

In field theory contexts the above symmetric double-well potential is often written ($\phi$ being a scalar field)

$$V(\phi) = \frac{m^4}{2g^2}\left(1-\frac{g^2\phi^2}{m^2}\right)^2,$$

and the instanton is the solution $\phi_c(\tau)$ of the Newton-like equation

$$\frac{d^2\phi}{d\tau^2} = V'(\phi), \;\;\;  \frac{1}{2}\left(\frac{d\phi}{d\tau}\right)^2- V(\phi) = -E_{cl} = 0$$

($\tau$ being the Euclidean time), i.e

$$\phi_c(\tau) = \frac{m}{g}\tanh \left[m(\tau-\tau_0)\right].$$

The equation of small fluctuations $\eta$ about $\phi_c, \phi = \phi_c + \eta,$ is the Pöschl-Teller equation (see Pöschl-Teller potential)

$$\left[-\frac{d^2}{d\tau^2} + V''(\phi_c)\right]\eta_n(\tau) = \omega^2_n\eta_n(\tau),$$

with

$$V''(\phi_c) = 4m^2 -\frac{6m^2}{\cosh^2 m(\tau-\tau_0)}.$$

Since all eigenvalues $\omega^2_n$ are positive or zero, the instanton configuration is stable and there is no decay.

In the more general case of $E_{cl}\neq 0$ the classical solution is the periodic instanton

$$\phi_c(\tau) = \frac{kb(k)}{g} sn[b(k)(\tau - \tau_0)], \;\;\; b(k) = m\left(\frac{2}{1+k^2}\right)^{1/2},$$

where $k$ is the elliptic modulus of the periodic Jacobian elliptic function $sn$. The small fluctuation equation is in this general case a Lamé equation. In the limit $k=1, E_{cl}=0$ the solution $\phi_c$ becomes the vacuum instanton solution,

$$\phi_c = \frac{m}{g} \tanh [m(\tau - \tau_0)].$$

== Inverted double-well potential ==
Perturbation theory along with matching of solutions in domains of overlap and imposition of boundary conditions (different from those for the double-well) can again be used to obtain the eigenvalues of the Schrödinger equation for this potential. In this case, however, one expands around the central trough of the potential. The results are therefore different from those above.

In terms of parameters as in the Schrödinger equation for the inverted double-well potential in the following form

$$\frac{d^2y(z)}{dz^2} + [E - V(z)]y(z)=0, \;\;\;
V(z) = \frac{1}{4}h^4z^2 - \frac{1}{2}c^2z^4, \;\; h^4>0,\; c^2>0,$$

the eigenvalues for $q_0=1,3,5, ...$ are found to be (see book of Müller-Kirsten, formula (18.86), p. 503)

$$E = \frac{1}{2}q_0h^2 - \frac{3c^2}{4h^4}(q_0^2+1) - \frac{q_0c^4}{2^6h^{10}}(3q^4-4q^2-167) + O(\frac{1}{h^{16}})
+ i\frac{2^{q_0}h^2(h^6/2c^2)^{q_0/2}}{(2\pi)^{1/2}[(q_0-1)/2]!}e^{-h^6/6c^2}.$$

The imaginary part of this expression agrees with the result of C.M. Bender and T.T. Wu (see their formula (3.36) and set $\hbar = 1$, and in their notation $q_0=2K+1, h^6/2c^2=\epsilon$). This result plays an important role in the discussion and investigation of the large order behavior of perturbation theory.

== Pure anharmonic oscillator ==
In terms of parameters as in the Schrödinger equation for the pure anharmonic oscillator in the following form

$$\frac{d^2y(z)}{dz^2} + [E-V(z)]y(z) = 0, \;\;\;
V(z) =  \frac{1}{4}h^4z^2 + \frac{1}{2}c^2z^4, \;\; h^4>0, \; c^2>0,$$

the eigenvalues for $q=q_0=1,3,5, ...$ are found to be

$$E = \frac{1}{2}qh^2 + \frac{3c^2}{4h^4}(q^2+1)-\frac{c^4}{h^{10}}q(4q^2+29) + O(\frac{1}{h^{16}}).$$

More terms can easily be calculated. Observe the coefficients of the expansion are alternately even or odd in $q$ and $h^2$, as in all other cases. This is an important aspect of the solutions of the differential equation for quartic potentials.

== General comments ==
The above results for the double-well and the inverted double-well can also be obtained by the path integral method (there via periodic instantons, cf. instantons), and the WKB method, though with the use of elliptic integrals and the Stirling approximation of the gamma function, all of which make the calculation more difficult. The symmetry property of the perturbative part in changes q → -q, $h^2$ → -$h^2$ of the results can only be obtained in the derivation from the Schrödinger equation which is therefore the better and correct way to obtain the result. This conclusion is supported by investigations of other second-order differential equations like the Mathieu equation and the Lamé equation which exhibit similar properties in their eigenvalue equations. Moreover in each of these cases (double-well, inverted double-well, cosine potential) the equation of small fluctuations about the classical configuration is a Lamé equation.
