= Harald J. W. Mueller-Kirsten =

German physicist

Harald J.W. Mueller-Kirsten
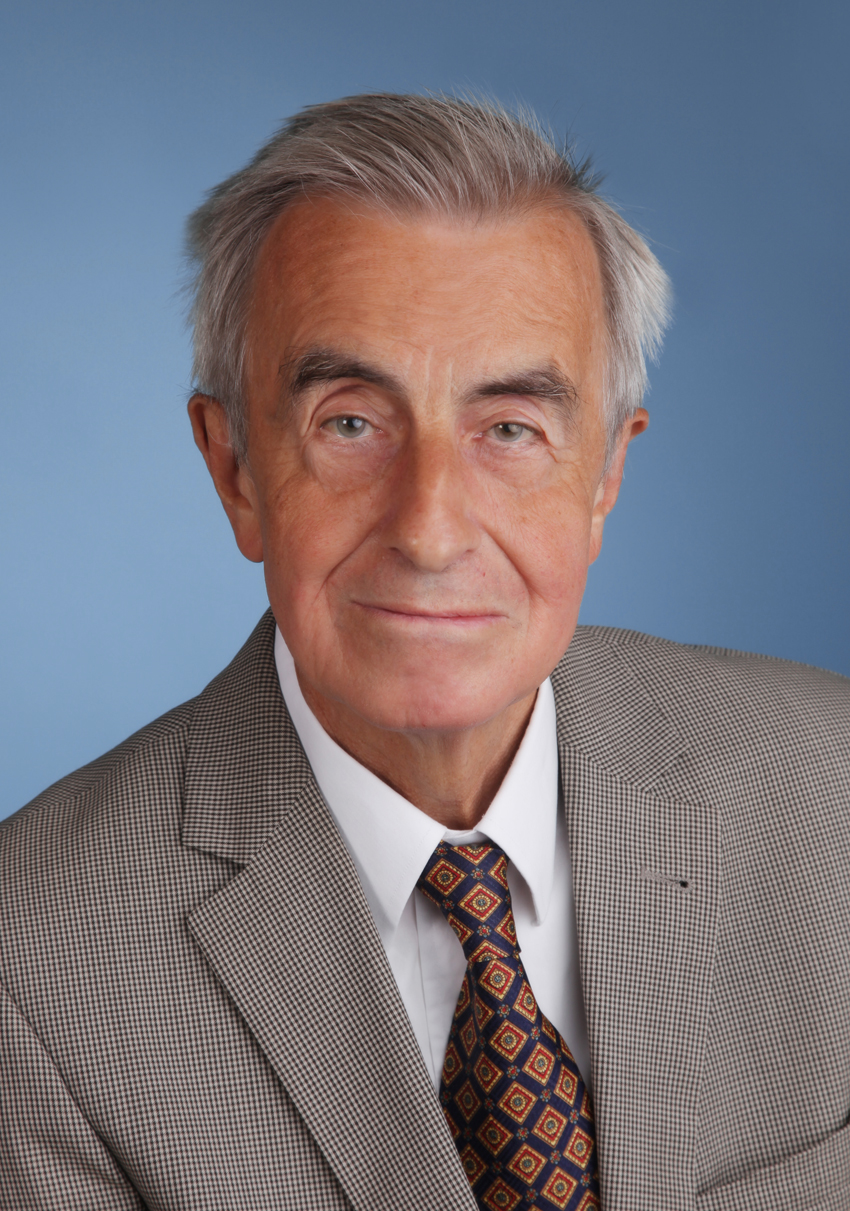
- H.J.W. Müller-Kirsten
- Born: May 19, 1935 (age 91); Halle (Saale), Germany
- Education: University of Western Australia
- Known for: Asymptotic expansions of Functions of mathematical physics and their eigenvalues, Quantum field theory, Periodic instantons, Supersymmetry
- Scientific career
- Fields: Theoretical physics
- Doctoral advisor: Robert Balson Dingle

Harald J.W. Mueller-Kirsten (born 1935) is a German theoretical physicist specializing in theoretical particle physics and mathematical physics.

== Education and career ==
Müller-Kirsten obtained the B.Sc. (First Class Honours) in 1957 and the Ph.D. in 1960 from the University of Western Australia in Perth, where his doctoral advisor was Robert Balson Dingle. Thereafter he was postdoc at LMU Munich (Institute of F. Bopp) and obtained the habilitation there in 1971. Müller-Kirsten was an assistant professor at the American University of Beirut in 1967, NATO-Fellow at the Lawrence Radiation Laboratory in Berkeley in 1970, and Max-Kade-Foundation Fellow at SLAC, Stanford in 1974–75. In 1972, he was appointed Wissenschaftlicher Rat and Professor (H2) at the University of Kaiserslautern, then there in 1976 University Professor (C2) and in 1995 University Professor (C3).

== Research achievements ==
1. Asymptotic expansions of Mathieu functions, spheroidal wave functions, Lamé functions and ellipsoidal wave functions and their eigenvalues.
2. Asymptotic expansions of Regge poles for Yukawa potentials (in agreement with Langer-corrected WKB calculations).
3. Eigenvalue and level-splitting formula for double-well potentials.
4. Path integral method applied to quartic and cosine potentials.
5. Discovery that for quartic and cosine potentials the equation of small fluctuations around the classical solution is a Lamé equation.
6. Derivation of S-matrix and absorptivity for the singular potential $1/r^4$ (cf. modified Mathieu equation) and application to string theory.
7. Construction and quantization of gauge theory models, Faddeev–Jackiw quantization of systems with constraints,

== Books ==
- with Armin Wiedemann: Supersymmetry, An Introduction with Conceptual and Calculational Details, World Scientific, Singapore, 1987, ISBN 9971-5-0354-9, 2nd ed.as Introduction to Supersymmetry (=World Scientific Lecture Notes in Physics, Nr. 80), loc. cit. 2010, ISBN 978-981-4293-41-9.
- Electrodynamics, An Introduction including Quantum Effects, World Scientific, Hackensack NJ, 2004, ISBN 981-238-807-9, 2nd ed. Electrodynamics loc. cit. 2011, ISBN 978-981-4340-73-1, 3rd ed., 2026, ISBN 978-981-98-2559-2.
- Introduction to Quantum Mechanics: Schrödinger Equation and Path Integral, World Scientific, Singapore, 2006, ISBN 981-256-692-9, 2nd ed., World Scientific, Hackensack, NJ, 2012, ISBN 978-981-4397-73-5.
- Classical Mechanics and Relativity, World Scientific, Hackensack NJ, 2008, ISBN 978-981-283-251-1, 2nd ed., World Scientific, Singapore, 2024, ISBN 978-981-12-8711-4.
- Basics of Statistical Physics, A Bachelor Degree Introduction, World Scientific, Hackensack NJ, 2010, ISBN 978-981-4287-22-7, 2nd ed. as Basics of Statistical Physics, loc.cit. 2013, ISBN 978-981-4449-53-3, 3rd ed., 2022, ISBN 978-981-125-609-7.

=== Outside of physics ===
- In his book Rätsel Wahrheit (Puzzle Truth) Müller-Kirsten deals with university and society related topics such as the university as a competitive society and problems of freedom of speech and opinion, Verlag Haag+Herchen GmbH, 2017, ISBN 978-3-89846-783-4.
- Henry Kendall: Ausgewählte Gedichte, Translation into German (by H.J.W. Müller-Kirsten) of Selected Poems by Henry Kendall (after Selected Poems by Henry Kendall, chosen by his son Frederick C. Kendall, Angus and Robertson Ltd., 1927), Verlag Haag+Herchen GmbH, 2021, ISBN 978-3-89846-878-7.
- Der Lockruf der Südsee (Travelling through the South Pacific) by H.J.W. Müller-Kirsten, Verlag Haag+Herchen GmbH, 2023, ISBN 978-3-89846-904-3.
