= Characteristic exponent =

In mathematics, characteristic exponent may refer to:

- Characteristic exponent of a field, a number equal to 1 if the field has characteristic 0, and equal to p if the field has characteristic p > 0
- Lyapunov characteristic exponent, a quantity that characterizes the rate of separation
- Characteristic exponent of Stable distribution
- The logarithm of a characteristic function
- Logarithm of a characteristic multiplier in the Floquet theory
- Solution of the indicial equation of the Frobenius method
