= Meissner equation =

The Meissner equation is a linear ordinary differential equation that is a special case of Hill's equation with the periodic function given as a square wave. There are many ways to write the Meissner equation. One is as

$$\frac{d^2y}{dt^2} + (\alpha^2 + \omega^2 \sgn \cos(t))y = 0$$

or

$$\frac{d^2y}{dt^2} + ( 1 + r f(t;a,b) ) y = 0$$

where

$$f(t;a,b) = -1 + 2 H_a( t \mod (a+b) )$$

and $H_c(t)$ is the Heaviside function shifted to $c$. Another version is

$$\frac{d^2y}{dt^2} + \left(   1 + r \frac{\sin( \omega t)}{|\sin(\omega t)|} \right) y = 0.$$

The Meissner equation was first studied as a toy model of oscillations observed in the rod gear of electric trains where the elasticity of the system could not reasonably be treated as a constant . It is also useful for understand resonance problems in the quantum mechanics of semiconductors and evolutionary biology under periodic environment switching.

Because the time-dependence is piecewise linear, many calculations can be performed exactly, unlike for the Mathieu equation. When $a = b = 1$, the Floquet exponents are roots of the quadratic equation

$$\lambda^2 - 2 \lambda \cosh(\sqrt{r}) \cos(\sqrt{r}) + 1 = 0 .$$

The determinant of the Floquet matrix is 1, implying that origin is a center if $|\cosh(\sqrt{r}) \cos(\sqrt{r})| < 1$ and a saddle node otherwise.
