= Hill equation =

Hill equation may refer to

- Hill equation (biochemistry)
- Hill differential equation
