= Multiplier =

Multiplier may refer to:

== Mathematics ==
- Multiplier (arithmetic), the number of multiples being computed in multiplication
- Constant multiplier, a constant factor with units of measurement
- Lagrange multiplier, a scalar variable used in mathematics to solve an optimisation problem for a given constraint
- Multiplier (Fourier analysis), an operator that multiplies the Fourier coefficients of a function by a specified function (known as the symbol)
- Multiplier of orbit, a formula for computing a value of a variable based on its own previous value or values; see Periodic points of complex quadratic mappings
- Characteristic multiplier, an eigenvalue of a monodromy matrix
- Multiplier algebra, a construction on C*-Algebras and similar structures

== Electrical engineering ==
- Binary multiplier, a digital circuit to perform rapid multiplication of two numbers in binary representation
- Analog multiplier, a device that multiplies two analog signals
- Frequency multiplier, a device that generates a signal at an integer multiple of its input frequency
- Voltage multiplier, an electrical circuit that converts AC electrical power from a lower voltage to a higher DC voltage.
- Schweigger multiplier, an early galvanometer

== Macroeconomics ==
- Multiplier (economics), any measure of the proportional effect of an exogenous variable on an endogenous variable
- Fiscal multiplier, the ratio of the change in aggregate demand to the change in government spending that caused it
- Money multiplier, the ratio of the money generated by the banking system to the central bank's increase in the monetary base that caused it

== Others ==
- Force multiplier, in warfare a factor that dramatically increases the combat-effectiveness of a given military force
- A multiplier fishing reel creates less friction when casting
- A CPU multiplier allows a CPU to perform more cycles per single cycle of the front side bus
- Multiplier (linguistics), an adjective indicating number of times something is to be multiplied
- Multipliers: How the Best Leaders Make Everyone Smarter
