= Sphaleron =

Solution to field equations in Standard Model particle physics

- Composition: Roughly, a high-energy composite of 3 leptons or of 3 baryons
- Status: Hypothetical
- Mass: ~10 TeV

An example of a saddle point (in red) on a simple function.

A sphaleron (Greek: σφαλερός "slippery") is a static (time-independent) solution to the electroweak field equations of the Standard Model of particle physics, and is involved in certain hypothetical processes that violate baryon and lepton numbers. Such processes cannot be represented by perturbative methods such as Feynman diagrams, and are therefore called non-perturbative. Geometrically, a sphaleron is a saddle point of the electroweak potential (in infinite-dimensional field space).

This saddle point rests at the top of a barrier between two different low-energy equilibria of a given system; the two equilibria are labeled with two different baryon numbers. One of the equilibria might consist of three baryons; the other, alternative, equilibrium for the same system might consist of three antileptons. In order to cross this barrier and change the baryon number, a system must either tunnel through the barrier (in which case the transition is an instanton-like (Note: There is no true instanton in electroweak theory; instead, the tunneling rate is determined by constrained instantons.) process) or must for a reasonable period of time be brought up to a high enough energy that it can classically cross over the barrier (in which case the process is termed a "sphaleron" process and can be modeled with an eponymous sphaleron particle).

In both the instanton and sphaleron cases, the process can only convert groups of three baryons into three antileptons (or three antibaryons into three leptons) and vice versa. This violates conservation of baryon number and lepton number, but the difference B − L is conserved. The minimum energy required to trigger the sphaleron process is believed to be around 10 TeV; however, sphalerons cannot be produced in existing LHC collisions, because although the LHC can create collisions of energy 10 TeV and greater, the generated energy cannot be concentrated in a manner that would create sphalerons.

A sphaleron is similar to the midpoint ( τ = 0 ) of the instanton, so it is non-perturbative. This means that under normal conditions sphalerons are unobservably rare. However, they would have been more common at the higher temperatures of the early universe.

== Baryogenesis ==
Since a sphaleron may convert baryons to antileptons and antibaryons to leptons and thus change the baryon number, if the density of sphalerons was at some stage high enough, they could wipe out any net excess of baryons or anti-baryons. This has two important implications in any theory of baryogenesis within the Standard Model:

- Any baryon net excess arising before the electroweak symmetry breaking would be wiped out due to abundant sphalerons caused by high temperatures existing in the early universe.
- While a baryon net excess can be created during the electroweak symmetry breaking, it can be preserved only if this phase transition was first-order. This is because in a second-order phase transition, sphalerons would wipe out any baryon asymmetry as it is created, while in a first-order phase transition, sphalerons would wipe out baryon asymmetry only in the unbroken phase.

In absence of processes which violate B − L it is possible for an initial baryon asymmetry to be protected if it has a non-zero projection onto B − L. In this case the sphaleron processes would impose an equilibrium which distributes the initial B asymmetry between both B and L numbers. In some theories of baryogenesis, an imbalance of the number of leptons and antileptons is formed first by leptogenesis and sphaleron transitions then convert this to an imbalance in the numbers of baryons and antibaryons.

== Details ==
For an SU(2) gauge theory, neglecting $\theta_W$, we have the following equations for the gauge field and the Higgs field in the gauge $A_0 = A_r = 0$

$$\mathbf{A} = \nu\,\frac{\,f(\xi)\,}{\xi}~\hat{\mathbf{r}}\times\mathbf{\sigma} \, , \qquad
\phi = \frac{\nu}{\,\sqrt{2\,}\,}~h(\xi)~\hat{\mathbf{r}}\cdot\mathbf{\sigma}~\phi_0$$

where $~\xi = r\,g\,\nu~$,
$$~\phi_0 = \begin{bmatrix}1 \\ 0\end{bmatrix}~$$
, the symbols $~\sigma$ represent the generators of SU(2), $~g~$ is the electroweak coupling constant, and $~\nu~$ is the Higgs VEV absolute value. The functions $~h(\xi)~$ and $~f(\xi)~$, which must be determined numerically, go from 0 to 1 in value as their argument, $~\xi~$, goes from 0 to $\infty$.

For a sphaleron in the background of a non-broken phase, the Higgs field must obviously fall off eventually to zero as $~\xi~$ goes to infinity.

Note that in the limit $\xi \rightarrow \infty$, the gauge sector approaches one of the pure-gauge transformation $\frac{~\mathbf{r} \cdot \mathbf{\sigma}~}{ r }$, which is the same as the pure gauge transformation to which the BPST instanton approaches as $r \rightarrow \infty$ at $t = 0$, hence establishing the connection between the sphaleron and the instanton.

Baryon number violation is caused by the "winding" of the fields from one equilibrium to another. Each time the weak gauge fields wind, the count for each of the quark families and each of the lepton families is raised (or lowered, depending on the winding direction) by one; as there are three quark families, baryon number can only change in multiples of three. The baryon number violation can alternatively be visualized in terms of a kind of Dirac sea: in the course of the winding, a baryon originally considered to be part of the vacuum is now considered a real baryon, or vice versa, and all the other baryons stacked inside the sea are accordingly shifted by one energy level.

== Energy release ==
According to physicist Max Tegmark, the theoretical energy efficiency from conversion of baryons to antileptons would be orders of magnitude higher than the energy efficiency of existing power-generation technology such as nuclear fusion. Tegmark speculates that an extremely advanced civilization might use a "sphalerizer" to generate energy from ordinary baryonic matter.

== See also ==
- Chiral anomaly – Non-conservation of chiral current in physics
- Instanton – Solitons in Euclidean spacetime
- Theta vacuum – Yang–Mills theory vacuum state
- Periodic instantons – Finite energy solutions in Euclidean spacetime
- Lamé function – Solutions of Lamé's equation
- Electroweak star – Hypothetical types of stars

== References and notes ==
Notes

Citations
