= Charles Hermite =

French mathematician (1822–1901)

Charles Hermite FRS FRSE
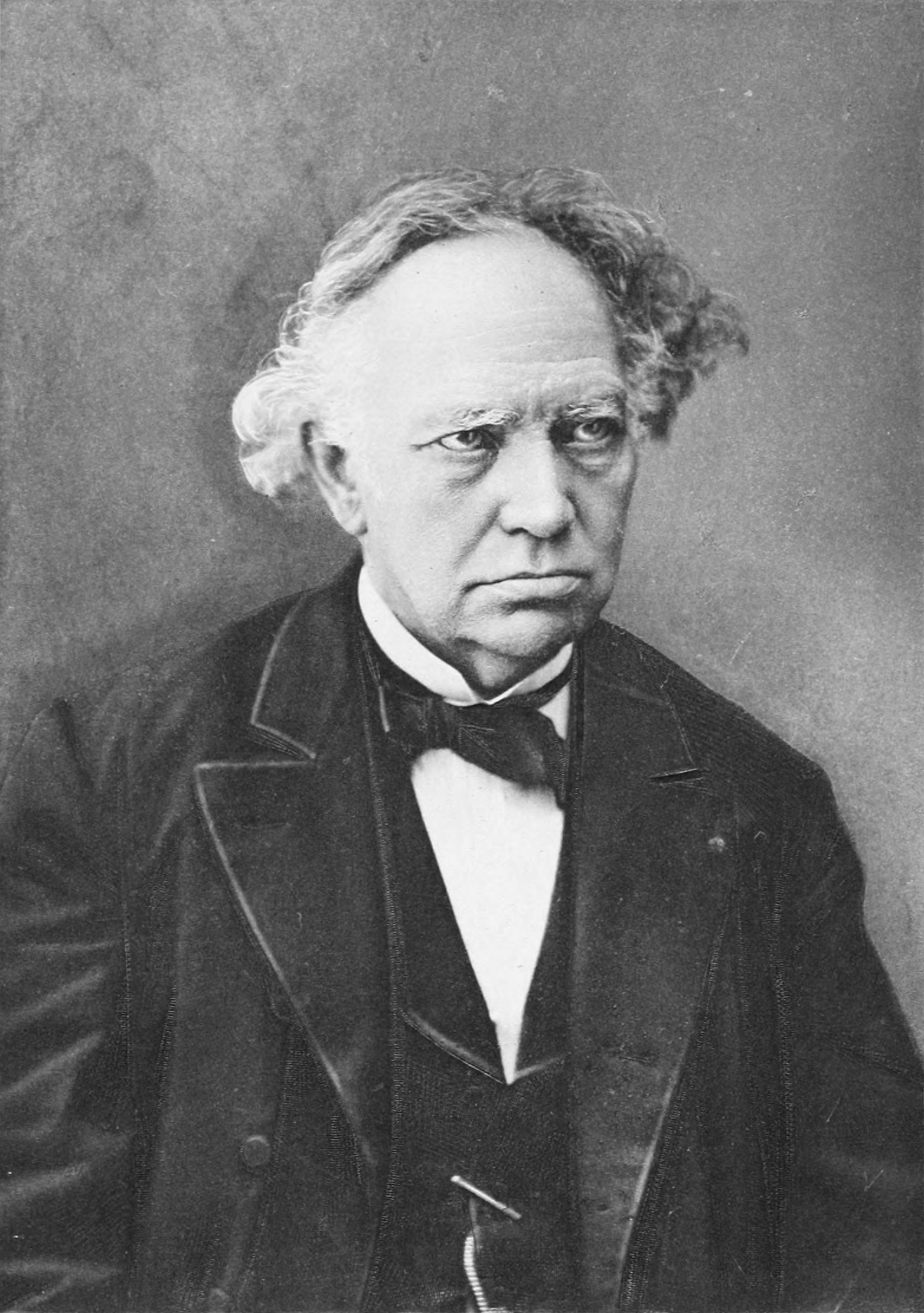
- Born: 24 December 1822; Dieuze, Moselle, Kingdom of France
- Died: 14 January 1901 (aged 78); Paris, French Third Republic
- Education: École Polytechnique
- Known for: Proof that e is transcendental; Hermitian matrices; Hermite polynomials; Full list
- Scientific career
- Fields: Mathematics
- Workplaces: École Polytechnique; Sorbonne
- Academic advisors: Eugène Charles Catalan; Joseph Liouville
- Doctoral students: Gaston Floquet; Henri Padé; Mihailo Petrović; Henri Poincaré; Thomas Stieltjes; Jules Tannery

Charles Hermite (French: [ʃaʁl ɛʁmit]; 24 December 1822 – 14 January 1901) was a French mathematician who studied analysis, number theory, and algebra. One of his most remarkable achievements was the proof of the transcendence of the number e.

== Life ==
Hermite was born in Dieuze, Moselle, on 24 December 1822, with a deformity in his right foot that would impair his gait throughout his life. He was the sixth of seven children of Ferdinand Hermite and his wife, Madeleine née Lallemand. Ferdinand worked in the drapery business of Madeleine's family while also pursuing a career as an artist. The drapery business relocated to Nancy in 1828, and so did the family.

Hermite obtained his secondary education at Collège de Nancy and then, in Paris, at Collège Henri IV and at the Lycée Louis-le-Grand. He read some of Joseph-Louis Lagrange's writings on the solution of numerical equations and Carl Friedrich Gauss's publications on number theory.

Hermite wanted to take his higher education at École Polytechnique, a military academy renowned for excellence in mathematics, science, and engineering. Tutored by mathematician Eugène Charles Catalan, Hermite devoted a year to preparing for the notoriously difficult entrance examination. In 1842 he was admitted to the school. However, after one year the school would not allow Hermite to continue his studies there because of his deformed foot. He struggled to regain his admission to the school, but the administration imposed strict conditions. Hermite did not accept this, and he quit the École Polytechnique without graduating.

After spending five years working privately towards his degree, in which he befriended eminent mathematicians Joseph Bertrand, Carl Gustav Jacob Jacobi, and Joseph Liouville, he took and passed the examinations for the baccalauréat, which he was awarded in 1847. He married Bertrand's sister, Louise, in 1848.

In 1848, Hermite returned to the École Polytechnique as répétiteur and examinateur d'admission. In July 1848, he was elected to the French Academy of Sciences. In 1856 he contracted smallpox. Through the influence of Augustin-Louis Cauchy and of a nun who nursed him, he resumed the practice of his Catholic faith. From 1862 to 1873 he was lecturer at the École Normale Supérieure. In 1869, he succeeded Jean-Marie Duhamel as professor of mathematics, both at the École Polytechnique, where he remained until 1876, and at the University of Paris, where he remained until his death. Upon his 70th birthday, he was promoted to grand officer in the French Legion of Honour.

He was elected to honorary membership of the Manchester Literary and Philosophical Society in 1892, on the same date as Charles Friedel, also of the Sorbonne.

On his last days Hermite suffered from a bout of asthma, a weak appetite, and poor sleep. He died in Paris on 14 January 1901, aged 78.

== Contribution to mathematics ==
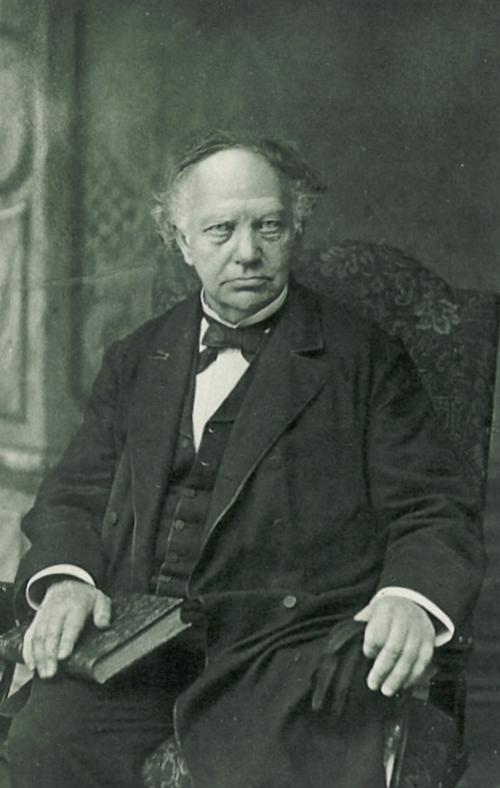
Charles Hermite circa 1887

In 1842, Nouvelles Annales de Mathématiques published Hermite's first original contribution to mathematics, a simple proof of Niels Henrik Abel's proposition concerning the impossibility of an algebraic solution to equations of the fifth degree, the Abel–Ruffini theorem. In a series of papers published in 1858, 1865, and 1866, Hermite showed that roots of the quintic polynomial could be obtained using elliptic integrals.

Since his student days, Hermite was deeply interested in Abelian and elliptic functions, and, with encouragement from Joseph Liouville, corresponded with Carl Gustav Jacob Jacobi on these topics. This resulted in the inclusion, into the complete edition of Jacobi's works, of two articles by Hermite, one concerning the extension to Abelian functions of one of the theorems of Abel on elliptic functions, and the other concerning the transformation of elliptic functions.

In higher algebra, Hermite, Arthur Cayley, and James Joseph Sylvester simultaneously developed the theory of invariants, where Hermite discovered the law of reciprocity.

Hermite introduced the notion of an orthogonal matrix, which is equal to the inverse of its transpose, in 1854, though the modern formal definition was first stated by 1878 by Ferdinand Georg Frobenius. In 1855, Hermite proved that the eigenvalues of matrices equal to their own complex conjugate transposes, Hermitian matrices, are always real, thereby generalizing the 1829 result of Cauchy for $n \times n$ real symmetric matrices. The notion of Hermitian matrices was later extended for infinitely variables and became an important topic in the study of differential and integral equations thanks to the vision of David Hilbert. Such linear transformations, dubbed Hermitian operators, were used in the rigorous mathematical formulation of quantum mechanics first by Norbert Wiener and Max Born, and subsequently by Hilbert, Lothar Nordheim, and John von Neumann.

In 1864, Hermite presented a new class of special functions, Hermite polynomials, in the context of expansions in terms of continuous functions over unbounded intervals. Hermite functions, which are the product of Hermite polynomials and a Gaussian function, find application in quantum mechanics, wherein they arise as solutions to the Schrödinger equation for the quantum harmonic oscillator.

In 1873, he published a lengthy paper demonstrating in two different ways that e, the base of the natural logarithm, is transcendental, based on prior work by Joseph Liouville. In the same year, Hermite proved that $\pi^2$ and therefore $\pi$ are irrational. However, he did not address the transcendence of $\pi$, believing the question to be beyond his powers. But techniques similar to those he employed in this proof were later used by Ferdinand von Lindemann in 1882 to prove that result for π. (Also see the Lindemann–Weierstrass theorem.) Hilbert subsequently simplified Hermite's original proof. In 1947, Ivan Niven exploited a technique of Hermite to give an elementary proof that $\pi$ is irrational.

Later in his life, Hermite turned his attention to the calculus, in particular, the theory of linear differential equations, and found solutions to Lamé's equation.

== Legacy ==
In addition to the mathematics properties named in his honor, the Hermite crater near the Moon's north pole is named after Hermite.

== Publications ==
The following is a list of his works:

- "Sur quelques applications des fonctions elliptiques", Paris, 1855; page images from Cornell.
- "Cours d'Analyse de l'École Polytechnique. Première Partie", Paris: Gauthier–Villars, 1873.
- "Cours professé à la Faculté des Sciences", edited by Andoyer, 4th ed., Paris, 1891; page images from Cornell.
- "Correspondance", edited by Baillaud and Bourget, Paris, 1905, 2 vols.; PDF copy from UMDL.
- "Œuvres de Charles Hermite", edited by Picard for the Academy of Sciences, 4 vols., Paris: Gauthier–Villars, 1905, 1908, 1912 and 1917; PDF copy from UMDL.
- "Œuvres de Charles Hermite", reissued by Cambridge University Press, 2009; ISBN 978-1-108-00328-5.

== See also ==
- List of things named after Charles Hermite
- Classical orthogonal polynomials
