= Floquet theory =

Branch of ordinary differential equations

Given a system in which the forces are periodic—such as a pendulum under a periodic driving force, or an oscillating circuit driven by alternating current—the overall behavior of the system is not necessarily fully periodic. For instance, consider a child being pushed on a swing: although the motion is driven by regular, periodic pushes, the swing can gradually reach greater heights while still oscillating to and fro. This results in a combination of underlying periodicity and growth.

Floquet theory provides a way to analyze such systems. Its essential insight is similar to the swing example: the solution can be decomposed into two parts—a periodic component (reflecting the repeated motion) and an exponential factor (reflecting growth, decay, or neutral stability). This decomposition allows for the analysis of long-term behavior and stability in time-periodic systems.

Formally, Floquet theory is a branch of ordinary differential equations relating to the class of solutions to periodic linear differential equations of the form
$$\dot{x} = A(t) x,$$
with $x\in{R^{n}}$ and $\displaystyle A(t) \in {R^{{n\times n}}}$ being a periodic function with period $T$ and defines the state of the stability of solutions.

The main theorem of Floquet theory, Floquet's theorem, due to Gaston Floquet (1883), gives a canonical form for each fundamental matrix solution of this common linear system. It gives a coordinate change $\displaystyle y=Q^{-1}(t)x$ with $\displaystyle Q(t+2T)=Q(t)$ that transforms the periodic system to a traditional linear system with constant, real coefficients. When applied to physical systems with periodic potentials, such as crystals in condensed matter physics, the result is known as Bloch's theorem.

Note that the solutions of the linear differential equation form a vector space. A matrix $\phi\,(t)$ is called a fundamental matrix solution if the columns form a basis of the solution set. A matrix $\Phi(t)$ is called a principal fundamental matrix solution if all columns are linearly independent solutions and there exists $t_0$ such that $\Phi(t_0)$ is the identity. A principal fundamental matrix can be constructed from a fundamental matrix using $\Phi(t)=\phi\,(t){\phi\,}^{-1}(t_0)$. The solution of the linear differential equation with the initial condition $x(0)=x_0$ is $x(t)=\phi\,(t){\phi\,}^{-1}(0)x_0$ where $\phi \,(t)$ is any fundamental matrix solution.

== Floquet's theorem ==
Let $\dot{x}= A(t) x$ be a linear first order differential equation, where $x(t)$ is a column vector of length $n$ and $A(t)$ an $n \times n$ periodic matrix with period $T$ (that is $A(t + T) = A(t)$ for all real values of $t$). Let $\phi\, (t)$ be a fundamental matrix solution of this differential equation. Then, for all $t \in \mathbb{R}$,
$$\phi(t+T)=\phi(t) \phi^{-1}(0) \phi (T).$$
Here
$$\phi^{-1}(0) \phi (T)$$
is known as the monodromy matrix. In addition, for each choice of matrix $B$ (possibly complex) such that
$$e^{TB}=\phi^{-1}(0) \phi (T),$$
there is a periodic (with period $T$) matrix function $t \mapsto P(t)$ such that
$$\phi (t) = P(t)e^{tB}\text{ for all }t \in \mathbb{R}.$$
This representation is called a Floquet normal form for the fundamental matrix solution $\phi \, (t)$.

Moreover, if $\phi(t)$ is a real matrix for every value of $t$, then there also exists at-least one real matrix $R$ which satisfies
$$\phi^{-1}(0) \phi (2T)=(\phi^{-1}(0) \phi (T))^2=e^{2TR}.$$
For any choice of such $R$, there is a real periodic (with period-$2T$) matrix function $t \mapsto Q(t)$ such that
$$\phi (t) = Q(t)e^{tR}\text{ for all }t \in \mathbb{R}.$$
In the above $B$, $P$, $Q$ and $R$ are $n \times n$ matrices.

== Second-order periodic equations ==
Floquet's theory is applied to the special case of a second order equation
$$-y'' + V(x)y = Ey$$
where $V(x)$ is a periodic potential, $V(x+T) = V(x)$. Such equations arise in the study of Hill's equation, the Lamé, and Mathieu equation. The spectral parameter $E$ corresponds to the energy levels of the Schrödinger operator $L=-\frac{d^2}{dx^2} + V(x)$.

For a given value of the parameter $E$, let $u(x,E)$ and $v(x,E)$ be the pair of solutions such that
$$u(0,E) = 1, \quad u'(0,E) = 0,\quad v(0,E) = 0,\quad v'(0,E) = 1.$$
Because the potential is periodic, superposition implies that there exist constants $A(E),B(E),C(E),D(E)$ with
$$u(x+T,E) = A(E)u(x,E) + B(E)v(x,E),\quad v(x+T,E) = C(E)u(x,E) + D(E)v(x,E).$$
In matrix form,
$$\begin{pmatrix} u(x+T,E)\\ v(x+T,E)\end{pmatrix} = \begin{pmatrix}A(E) & B(E)\\ C(E) & D(E)\end{pmatrix}\begin{pmatrix} u(x,E)\\ v(x,E)\end{pmatrix}$$
expressing the monodromy of the fundamental solution. (The matrix here is called the monodromy matrix $M(E)$.)

A solution is called a Floquet solution if
$$y(x+T) = \xi\,y(x)$$
for some constant $\xi$ called a Floquet multiplier. Writing a Floquet solution as $y(x) = a\,u(x,E) + b\,v(x,E)$ shows that $(a,b)$ must be a (left) eigenvector of $M(E)$, so $\xi$ satisfies
$$\xi^2-(A(E) + D(E))\xi + \det M(E) = 0.$$
Because the Wronskian of the solutions $u(x,E)$ and $v(x,E)$ is constant, $\det M(E) = 1$ so this equation simplifies to
$$\xi^2-(A(E) + D(E))\xi + 1 = 0$$
or equivalently
$$\xi + \xi^{-1} = A(E) + D(E).$$
Thus there are generically two Floquet multipliers for each energy $E$.

The values of $E$ for which the Floquet multiplier satisfies $\xi=\pm1$ are called the periodic and antiperiodic eigenvalues. They form the endpoints of the spectral bands of the periodic Schrödinger operator. For real values of $E$, the behavior of solutions is determined by the magnitude of the Floquet multipliers. A nontrivial solution remains bounded on the real line if and only if the corresponding multipliers satisfy $|\xi|=1$. The set of such energies consists of a union of intervals
$$[E_1,E_2],\;[E_3,E_4],\;\ldots,$$
called the spectral bands, separated by intervals (band gaps) where solutions are not bounded. As $E$ varies across a spectral band, the Floquet multipliers move along the unit circle in the complex plane, and the endpoints of each band occur precisely when $\xi=\pm1$.

Introducing a new variable $\nu = \xi - \xi^{-1}$, one has
$$\nu^2 = (\xi + \xi^{-1})^2 - 4 = (A(E) + D(E))^2 - 4.$$
This defines a two-sheeted cover of the energy line, called the spectral curve. For a general analytic potential, this cover is analytic rather than algebraic. In special situations, however, it becomes an algebraic curve. For example, for the Lamé equation $y''(x) - g(g+1)\wp(x)y(x) = Ey(x)$ with integer degree $g$, the corresponding curve is hyperelliptic and can be written
$$\nu^2 = R_{2g+1}(E)$$
where $R_{2g+1}$ is the Lamé spectral polynomial.

== Stability ==
This mapping $\phi \,(t) = Q(t)e^{tR}$ gives rise to a time-dependent change of coordinates ($y = Q^{-1}(t) x$), under which our original system becomes a linear system with real constant coefficients $\dot{y} = R y$. Since $Q(t)$ is continuous and periodic it must be bounded. Thus the stability of the solutions $y(t)$ and $x(t)$ are determined by the eigenvalues of $R$.

The eigenvalues of $e^{TB}$ are called the characteristic multipliers of the system. While the matrix $B$ is not unique, the eigenvalues of $e^{TB}$ are the same for choices of $B$. They are also the eigenvalues of the (linear) Poincaré maps $x(t) \to x(t+T)$. A Floquet exponent (sometimes called a characteristic exponent), is a complex $\mu$ such that $e^{\mu T}$ is a characteristic multiplier of the system. Notice that Floquet exponents are not unique, since $e^{\left(\mu + \frac{2 \pi i k}{T}\right)T}=e^{\mu T}$, where $k$ is an integer. The real parts of the Floquet exponents are Lyapunov exponents. The zero solution is asymptotically stable if all Floquet exponents have negative real part. It is Lyapunov stable if all Floquet exponents have nonpositive real part and, in addition, the Floquet multipliers of modulus 1 are semisimple (equivalently, their algebraic and geometric multiplicities agree); otherwise it is unstable.

== Applications ==
- Floquet theory is used in the study of dynamical systems, such as the Mathieu equation (named after Émile Léonard Mathieu).
- Floquet theory can also be applied to discrete dynamical systems and difference equations.
- Floquet theory shows stability in Hill differential equations (introduced by George William Hill). Such equations arise, for example, in approximating the motion of the moon as a harmonic oscillator in a periodic gravitational field.
- Bond softening and bond hardening in intense laser fields can be described in terms of solutions obtained from the Floquet theorem.
- Dynamics of strongly driven quantum systems are often examined using Floquet theory. In superconducting circuits, Floquet framework has been leveraged to shed light on the quantum electrodynamics of drive-induced multiqubit interactions and drive induced state transitions.
- Floquet theory is also used in driven quantum condensed matter systems which are topologically non-trivial. The topology of the driven system is analyzed by studying the Floquet Hamiltonian.
