= Gaston Floquet =

French mathematician

Achille Marie Gaston Floquet
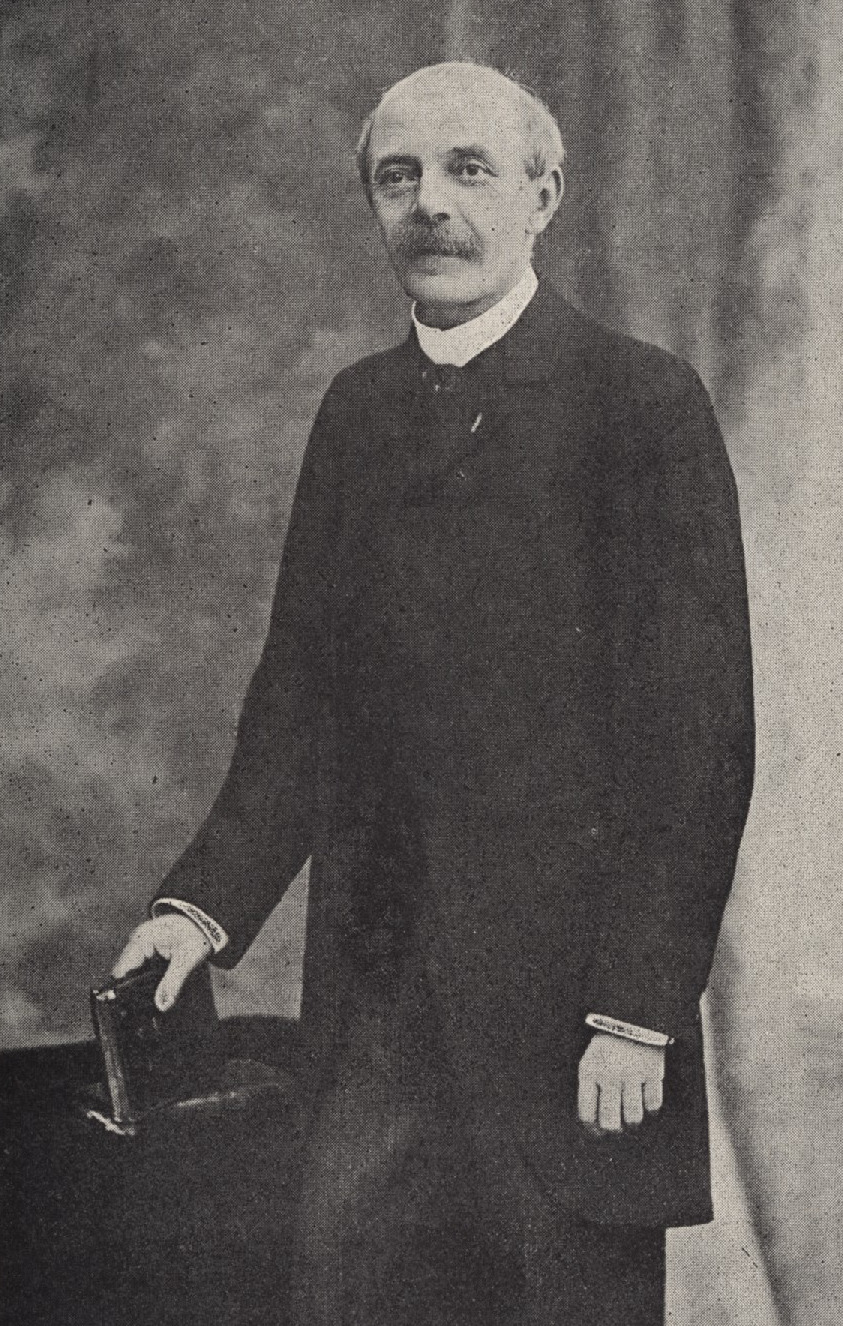
- Born: 15 December 1847; Épinal, France
- Died: 7 October 1920 (aged 72); Nancy, France
- Education: École Normale Supérieure; Faculty of Science, University of Paris
- Known for: Floquet theory
- Scientific career
- Fields: Mathematics
- Workplaces: University of Lorraine
- Thesis: Sur la théorie des équations différentielles linéaires (1879)
- Doctoral advisor: Charles Hermite

Achille Marie Gaston Floquet (15 December 1847 – 7 October 1920) was a French mathematician, best known for his work in mathematical analysis, especially in theory of differential equations. Floquet theory, the study of differential equations with periodic coefficients, is named after him.

== Biography ==
Achille Marie Gaston Floquet was born on 15 December 1847 in Épinal to Jean Baptiste Floquet (1810-1894) and Joséphine Adèle Berrurier (1823-1855). He was educated at Lycée Louis-le-Grand and École normale supérieure in Paris. His studies at École normale supérieure was interrupted by the Franco-Prussian War in 1870, at which he served as a second lieutenant at Army of the Loire. Resuming his studies after the war, Floquet completed his studies in 1873 and was appointed as a mathematics instructor at the Lycée de Belfort. Receiving his mathematics agrégation on 15 September 1875, he became a professor of elementary mathematics at the Lycée d'Angers. In the following year, he was appointed as the professor of special mathematics at the Lycée de Clermont-Ferrand. On 13 February 1878, he was elected as maître de conférences at the Faculty of Science at Nancy.

Studying linear differential equations at Faculty of Sciences in Paris under Charles Hermite, Floquet submitted his doctoral thesis, Sur la théorie des équations différentielles linéaires, on 8 April 1879. His subsequent publications extended on his doctoral work and introduced the theory for differential equations with periodic coefficients, now known as Floquet theory. In November 1879, he received a temporary appointment at University of Nancy as a mathematics professor; in 1880 he was given a permanent chair. He became the head of the Faculty of Science at University of Nancy in 1905. During his tenure, he has contributed significantly to the development of civil and military aviation in Nancy, organizing the fourth International Aeronautical Congress in 1909 and founding the National Eastern Aviation League. In 1912, he also cofounded the Institute of Aerodynamics and Meteorology with Edmond Rothé; nevertheless, the institute did not survive World War I.

Floquet married Marie Jeanne Léonie Genay in 1880. They had two children: Marguerite (1881-1914) and Paul (1882-1910). He died in Nancy on 7 October 1920.

== See also ==
- Floquet theory
