= Characteristic multiplier =

In mathematics, and particularly ordinary differential equations, a characteristic multiplier is an eigenvalue of a monodromy matrix. The logarithm of a characteristic multiplier is also known as characteristic exponent. They appear in Floquet theory of periodic differential operators and in the Frobenius method.

== See also ==
- Multiplier (disambiguation)
