= Greg McKeown (author) =

Author (born 1977)

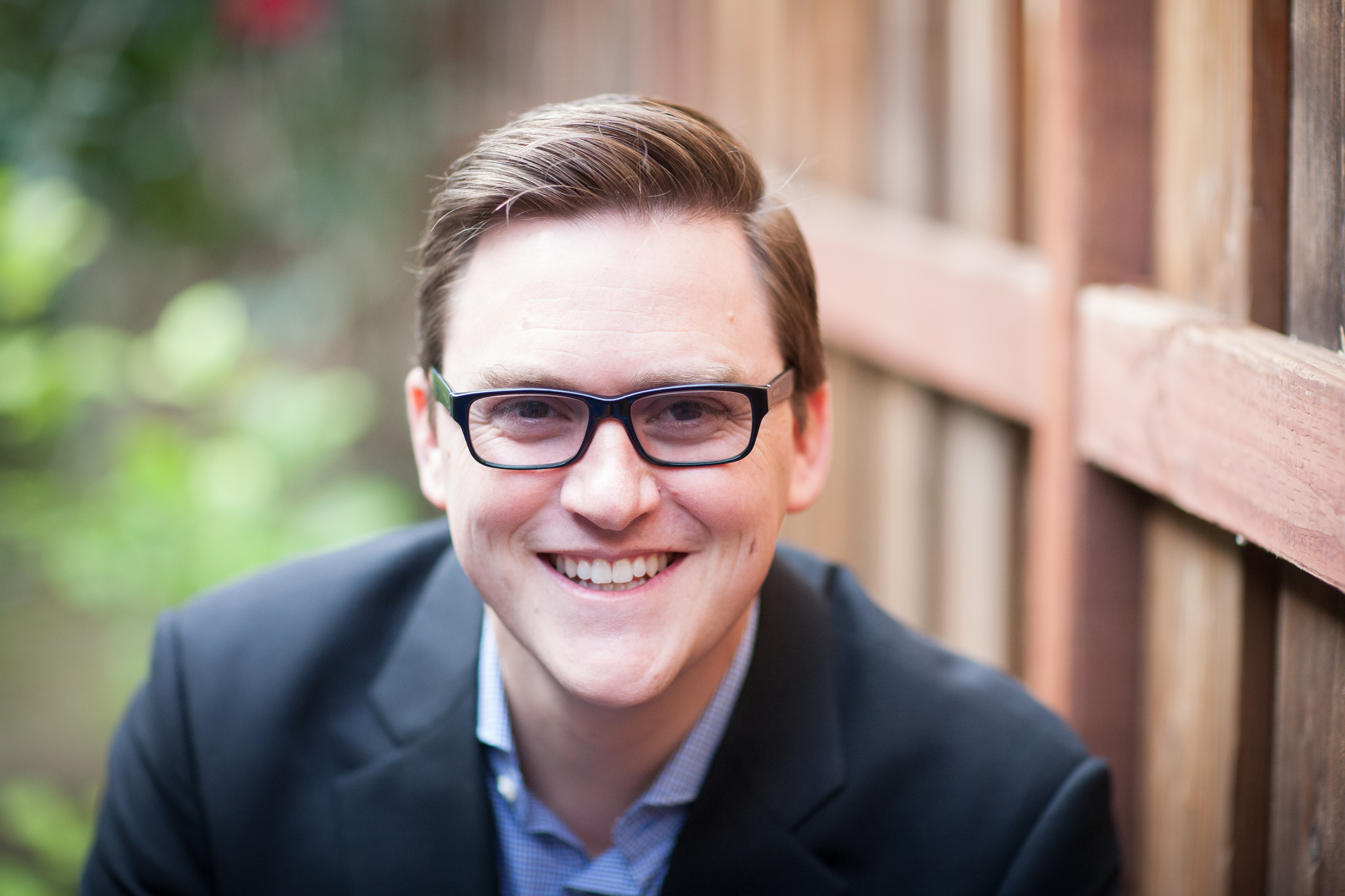
- Born: 1977 (age 48–49); London, England
- Education: Brigham Young University (B.A., Communications); Stanford Graduate School of Business (MBA)
- Occupations: Leadership/management consultant, Writer, and Public Speaker
- Honors: Young Global Leaders Inductee
- Website: gregmckeown.com

Greg McKeown (born 1977 in London, England) is an author, public speaker, leadership and business strategist.

== Education ==
McKeown earned an MBA from Stanford Graduate School of Business after completing BA in communications and journalism at Brigham Young University.

== Career ==
He is the founder and CEO of McKeown, Inc., a leadership and strategy design agency based in California. Prior to founding his eponymous company, McKeown worked for Heidrick & Struggles' Global Leadership Practice. According to the New Yorker, his strategies often revolve around minimalism. In 2012, The World Economic Forum inducted McKeown into the Forum of Young Global Leaders.

=== Author ===
McKeown is the author of Essentialism: The Disciplined Pursuit of Less, Effortless: Make It Easy to Do What Matters, and co-author (with Liz Wiseman) of the Multipliers: How the Best Leaders Make Everyone Smarter. All three have become New York Times bestsellers. His book Essentialism is a business and self-leadership book that discusses how to figure out what is essential, how to eliminate what's nonessential and how to make it as effortless as possible to do what really matters. It includes concepts such as the "90 percent rule", which encourages individuals to pay closer attention to those items they have a "more than ninety percent interest in" and to pay less attention other aspects of life. His work also focuses on the importance of saying "no" in other situations as well. Part of his recommendation to help with this is a method of journaling by only recording days with a few sentences rather than longer explanations.

He is also a blogger for the Harvard Business Review and LinkedIn’s Influencers Group.

=== Public Speaker ===
McKeown speaks on how to live and lead as an Essentialist. McKeown interviewed Al Gore at the Annual Conference of the World Economic Forum in Davos, Switzerland, and received an invitation to speak at his Annual Innovation Conference. McKeown has been interviewed on television and radio shows including NPR's All Things Considered and NBC.

== Personal life ==
Originally from London, England, McKeown now lives in California with his wife, Anna, and their four children. He served for three years as a lay bishop (an unpaid, volunteer position) in The Church of Jesus Christ of Latter-day Saints.

== Bibliography ==
Books authored or coauthored by McKeown

- McKeown, Greg (2014), Essentialism: The Disciplined Pursuit of Less, Crown Business, ISBN 978-0-80413-738-6
- ——; Wiseman, Liz (2010), Multipliers: How the Best Leaders Make Everyone Smarter, Harper Business, ISBN 978-0-06266-3-078
- —— (2021), Effortless: Make It Easier to Do What Matters Most
