= Leptogenesis =

Processes that could produce lepton-antilepton asymmetry

Unsolved problem in physics
Why does the observable universe have more matter than antimatter?
More unsolved problems in physics

In physical cosmology, leptogenesis is the generic term for hypothetical physical processes that produced an asymmetry between leptons and antileptons in the very early universe, resulting in the present-day dominance of leptons over antileptons. In the currently accepted Standard Model, lepton number is nearly conserved at temperatures below the TeV scale, but tunneling processes can change this number; at higher temperature it may change through interactions with sphalerons, particle-like entities. In both cases, the process involved is related to the weak nuclear force, and is an example of chiral anomaly.

Such processes could have hypothetically created leptons in the early universe. In these processes baryon number is also non-conserved, and thus baryons should have been created along with leptons. Such non-conservation of baryon number is indeed assumed to have happened in the early universe, and is known as baryogenesis. However, in some theoretical models, it is suggested that leptogenesis also occurred prior to baryogenesis; thus the term leptogenesis is often used to imply the non-conservation of leptons without corresponding non-conservation of baryons. In the Standard Model, the difference between the lepton number and the baryon number is precisely conserved, so that leptogenesis without baryogenesis is impossible. Thus such leptogenesis implies extensions to the Standard Model.

The lepton and baryon asymmetries affect the much better understood Big Bang nucleosynthesis at later times, during which light atomic nuclei began to form. Successful synthesis of the light elements requires that there be an imbalance in the number of baryons and antibaryons to one part in a billion when the universe is a few minutes old. An asymmetry in the number of leptons and antileptons is not mandatory for Big Bang nucleosynthesis. However, charge conservation suggests that any asymmetry in the charged leptons and antileptons (electrons, muons and tau particles) should be of the same order of magnitude as the baryon asymmetry. Observations of the primordial helium-4 abundance place an upper limit on any lepton asymmetry residing in the neutrino sector, which is not very stringent.

Leptogenesis theories employ sub-disciplines of physics such as quantum field theory, and statistical physics, to describe such possible mechanisms. Baryogenesis, the generation of a baryon–antibaryon asymmetry, and leptogenesis can be connected by processes that convert baryon number and lepton number into each other. The (non-perturbative) quantum Adler–Bell–Jackiw anomaly can result in sphalerons, which can convert leptons into baryons and vice versa. Thus, the Standard Model is in principle able to provide a mechanism to create baryons and leptons.

A simple modification of the Standard Model that is instead able to realize the program of Sakharov is the one suggested by M. Fukugita and T. Yanagida. The Standard Model is extended by adding right-handed neutrinos, permitting implementation of the see-saw mechanism and providing the neutrinos with mass. At the same time, the extended model is able to spontaneously generate leptons from the decays of right-handed neutrinos. Finally, the sphalerons are able to convert the spontaneously generated lepton asymmetry into the observed baryonic asymmetry. Due to its popularity, this entire process is sometimes referred to simply as leptogenesis.

== See also ==
- Baryogenesis – Hypothesized early universe process
