= Robert Balson Dingle =

British theoretical physicist

- Born: 26 March 1926
- Died: 2 March 2010 (aged 83)
- Education: University of Cambridge
- Known for: Mathematical physics, Condensed matter physics, Asymptotic expansions, Anomalous Skin effect, Liquid helium II, Mathematical Functions and Integrals
- Scientific career
- Fields: Theoretical Physics
- Doctoral advisor: Douglas Hartree
- Doctoral students: Michael V. Berry, Harald J. W. Mueller-Kirsten

Robert Balson Dingle (26 March 1926 – 2 March 2010) was a British theoretical physicist.

== Education ==
Dingle studied at the University of Cambridge, UK (Tripos Part I 1945, Part II 1946). He spent the year 1947-1948 at the University of Bristol where he worked under the supervision of Professors Nevill Francis Mott and Herbert Fröhlich, and then continued research in theoretical physics at the University of Cambridge under the supervision of Professor Douglas Hartree, earning the Ph.D. there in 1952. Following research positions in Delft (Netherlands) and in Ottawa (Canada) he was appointed Reader in theoretical physics at the University of Western Australia in Perth. In June 1960 he was appointed as the first occupant of the Chair of Theoretical Physics at the University of St. Andrews, UK. In 1961 he was elected as a fellow of the Royal Society of Edinburgh (FRSE).

In later years he spent sabbatical periods in Canada, California and in Australia, and through ill-health he retired in 1987.

== Research areas ==
Dingle’s research areas in theoretical physics were condensed matter physics and statistical mechanics; in particular he made significant original contributions in Bose-Einstein statistics of particles with special reference to low temperatures, magnetic and surface properties of metals, the anomalous skin effect in anisotropic metals and semiconductors, and liquid helium II. In mathematical physics he made major contributions in the fields of Bose-Einstein integrals, Fermi-Dirac integrals, and Mathieu functions. A main research area of Dingle's was the subject of asymptotic expansions with regard to their derivation and interpretation. His extensive researches in this latter field he compiled in his monograph on asymptotic expansions.

== Honours ==
- Fellow of the Royal Society of Edinburgh (FRSE).
