= Liz Wiseman =

American researcher

- Born: 1964 (age 61–62)
- Education: Brigham Young University (B.S. in Finance); Brigham Young University (M.OB.)
- Occupation: Author
- Spouse: Larry Wiseman
- Children: 4
- Writing career
- Notable work: Multipliers: How the Best Leaders Make Everyone Smarter
- Website: TheWisemanGroup.com

Liz Wiseman is a researcher and executive advisor who teaches leadership to executives around the world. She is the author of the New York Times bestsellers Multipliers: How the Best Leaders Make Everyone Smarter, The Multiplier Effect: Tapping the Genius Inside Our Schools, and Rookie Smarts: Why Learning Beats Knowing in the New Game of Work.

She is the CEO of the Wiseman Group, a leadership research and development firm headquartered in Silicon Valley, California. Some of her recent clients include Apple, AT&T, Disney, Facebook, Google, Microsoft, Nike, Salesforce, Tesla, and Twitter. Liz has been listed on the Thinkers50 ranking, and in 2019, she was recognized as the top leadership thinker in the world.

She has conducted research in the field of leadership and collective intelligence and writes for Harvard Business Review, Fortune, and a variety of other business and leadership journals. She is a frequent guest lecturer at BYU and Stanford University and is a former executive at Oracle Corporation, where she worked as the Vice President of Oracle University and as the global leader for Human Resource Development.

On September 23, 2021, Wiseman testified at the Hearing on Civility and Collaboration in Congress to discuss opportunities to help Congress foster relationships leading to a more collaborative and civil work environment.

== Education and career ==
Wiseman holds a bachelor's degree in business management and a Masters of Organizational Behavior from Brigham Young University. She began her career with Oracle Corporation upon graduating from BYU. Wiseman has also completed executive education courses with the University of Michigan, Wharton, Harvard, and MIT.

From 1988 through 2005, Wiseman worked for Oracle Corporation. During her career with Oracle, she led the creation of Oracle University, worked as the vice president of human Resource development, and led numerous global initiatives. Following her tenure at Oracle, she worked as an executive coach. It was during her years as an Oracle executive and later as an executive coach that she observed the differences between multiplying and diminishing leaders and then conducted the foundational research for her book Multipliers.

Wiseman is the CEO of the Wiseman Group, a leadership research and development firm headquartered in Silicon Valley, California.

== Personal life ==
Wiseman is a member of the Church of Jesus Christ of Latter-day Saints. As of 2017, she was an early morning seminary teacher.

== Published works ==
=== Books ===
- Multipliers, Updated, and Revised: How the Best Leaders Make Everyone Smarter HarperCollins. 2017. ISBN 978-0-062-66307-8.
- Multipliers: How the Best Leaders Make Everyone Smarter, co author Greg Mckeown. HarperCollins. 2010. ISBN 978-0-061-96439-8.
- Rookie Smarts: Why Learning Beats Knowing in the New Game of Work. HarperCollins. 2014. ISBN 978-0-06232-263-0.
- Wiseman, Liz; Allen, Lois; Foster, Elise (2013). The Multiplier Effect: Tapping the Genius Inside Our Schools. ISBN 978-1452271897.
- Impact Players: How to Take the Lead, Play Bigger, and Multiply Your Impact HarperCollins. 2021. ISBN 9780063063327.
