= Multipliers: How the Best Leaders Make Everyone Smarter =

2010 book by Liz Wiseman and Greg McKeown

- Hardcover edition
- Author: Liz Wiseman, Greg McKeown
- Language: English
- Subject: Leadership, collective intelligence, business
- Published: June 15, 2010
- Publisher: HarperCollins
- Publication place: United States
- Media type: Print (hardcover), e-book, audiobook
- Pages: 288
- ISBN: 9780061964398
- OCLC: 456180752

Multipliers: How the Best Leaders Make Everyone Smarter is a business book by Liz Wiseman and Greg McKeown. It was published on June 15, 2010 through HarperCollins and looks into different forms of leadership and how they can either help or hinder the people they are managing.

== Synopsis ==
In the book Wiseman and McKeown look at various types of leaders and identify two different types of leaders, Diminishers and Multipliers. Multipliers are leaders who encourage growth and creativity from their workers, while Diminishers are those who hinder and otherwise keep their employees' productivity at a minimum. The authors give what they consider to be solutions and guidance to the issues they bring up in the book.

== Reception ==
Critical reception was mostly positive, with the Gulf News commenting that it would help "usher in a decade focused less on stuff and more on people". Publishers Weekly gave a mixed review, stating that the "breadth of the material is better suited for a lengthy article than a full business book, and the effort to stretch it into a longer work diminishes the meaningful research".
