= Monodromy matrix =

Matrix used to study systems of ordinary differential equations

In mathematics, and particularly ordinary differential equations (ODEs), a monodromy matrix is the fundamental matrix of a system of ODEs evaluated at the period of the coefficients of the system. It is used for the analysis of periodic solutions of ODEs in Floquet theory.

== See also ==
- Floquet theory
- Monodromy
- Riemann–Hilbert problem
