= Émile Léonard Mathieu =

French mathematician

- Born: 15 May 1835; Metz, France
- Died: 19 October 1890 (aged 55); Nancy, France
- Known for: Mathieu functions
- Scientific career
- Fields: Mathematics; Mathematical physics
- Thesis: Sur le nombre de valeurs que peut acquérir une fonction quand on y permute ses lettres de toutes les manières possibles (1859)

Émile Léonard Mathieu (French: [matjø]; 15 May 1835 – 19 October 1890) was a French mathematician. He is known for his work in group theory and mathematical physics. He has given his name to the Mathieu functions, Mathieu groups and Mathieu transformation. He authored a treatise of mathematical physics in 6 volumes. Volume 1 is an exposition of the techniques to solve the differential equations of mathematical physics and contains an account of the applications of Mathieu functions to electrostatics. Volume 2 deals with capillarity. Volumes 3 and 4 deal with electrostatics and magnetostatics. Volume 5 deals with electrodynamics, and volume 6 with elasticity. The asteroid 27947 Emilemathieu was named in his honour.

== Early life ==
Émile Mathieu was born into a family of minor civil servants. His father, Nicolas Mathieu, was a cashier at the Tax Office of the city. His mother, Amélie Antoinette Aubertin, was from Metz while her brother, Pierre Aubertin, the uncle of our mathematician, had attended the École Polytechnique, was a colonel of artillery and the director of a foundry which made cannons. Émile Mathieu was brought up in Metz, and he attended school at the Lycée de Metz in that town. He excelled at school, first in classical studies showing remarkable abilities in Latin and Greek compositions. However, once he had met mathematics when he was in his teenage years, it became the only subject which he wanted to pursue. We mentioned above that his uncle Pierre Aubertin had studied at the École Polytechnique and he advised Émile on preparing himself for the entrance examinations which he took successfully in 1854.

== Books ==
- Traité de physique mathématique (6 vols.) (Gauthier-Villars, 1873-1890)
- Dynamique Analytique (Gauthier-Villars, 1878)
