= Hill differential equation =

Second order linear differential equation featuring a periodic function

In mathematics, the Hill equation or Hill differential equation is the second-order linear ordinary differential equation

$$\frac{d^2y}{dt^2} + f(t) y = 0,$$

where $f(t)$ is a periodic function with minimal period $\pi$. By this we mean that for all $t$

$$f(t+\pi)=f(t),$$

and if $p$ is a number with $0 < p < \pi$, the equation $f(t+p) = f(t)$ must fail for some $t$. It is named after George William Hill, who introduced it in 1886.

Because $f(t)$ has period $\pi$, the Hill equation can be rewritten using the Fourier series of $f(t)$:

$$\frac{d^2y}{dt^2}+\left(\theta_0+2\sum_{n=1}^\infty \theta_n \cos(2nt)+\sum_{m=1}^\infty \phi_m \sin(2mt) \right ) y=0.$$

Important special cases of Hill's equation include the Mathieu equation (in which only the terms corresponding to n = 0, 1 are included) and the Meissner equation.

Hill's equation is an important example in the understanding of periodic differential equations. Depending on the exact shape of $f(t)$, solutions may stay bounded for all time, or the amplitude of the oscillations in solutions may grow exponentially. The precise form of the solutions to Hill's equation is described by Floquet theory. Solutions can also be written in terms of Hill determinants.

Aside from its original application to lunar stability, the Hill equation appears in many settings including in modeling of a quadrupole mass spectrometer, as the one-dimensional Schrödinger equation of an electron in a crystal, quantum optics of two-level systems, accelerator physics and electromagnetic structures that are periodic in space and/or in time.
