= Monodromy =

Mathematical behavior near singularities

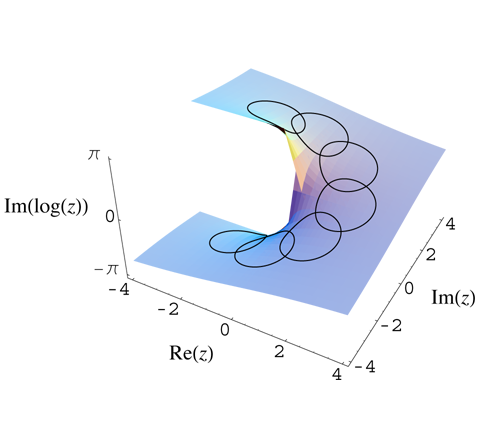
The imaginary part of the complex logarithm. Trying to define the complex logarithm on $\C-\{0\}$ gives different answers along different paths. This leads to an infinite cyclic monodromy group and a covering of $\C-\{0\}$ by a helicoid (an example of a Riemann surface).

In mathematics, monodromy is the study of how objects from mathematical analysis, algebraic topology, algebraic geometry and differential geometry behave as they "run round" a singularity. As the name implies, the fundamental meaning of monodromy comes from "running round singly". It is closely associated with covering maps and their degeneration into ramification; the aspect giving rise to monodromy phenomena is that certain functions we may wish to define fail to be single-valued as we "run round" a path encircling a singularity. The failure of monodromy can be measured by defining a monodromy group: a group of transformations acting on the data that encodes what happens as we "run round" in one dimension. Lack of monodromy is sometimes called polydromy.

== Definition ==
Let $X$ be a connected and locally simply connected based topological space with base point $x$, and let $p: \tilde{X} \to X$ be a covering. Define its base fiber $F = p^{-1}(x)$.

Any loop $\gamma: [0, 1] \to X$ based at $x$, can be lifted through the covering map. Any point $\tilde{x} \in F$ corresponds to a different lift $\tilde{\gamma}$ by setting $\tilde x = \tilde{\gamma}(0)$. Denote by $\gamma \cdot \tilde{x}$ the endpoint $\tilde{\gamma}(1)$, which is generally different from $\tilde{x}$.

Given any two $\gamma, \gamma'$ that represent the same element in the fundamental group $\pi_1(X, x)$, the covering homotopy property shows they define the same action $\gamma \cdot \tilde x = \gamma' \cdot \tilde x$. Thus, we can unambiguously write $[\gamma] \cdot \tilde x$, where $[\gamma] \in \pi_1(X, x)$ is the class of loops that are homotopy-equivalent to $\gamma$.

This construction gives a well-defined left group action of the fundamental group $\pi_1(X, x)$ on the base fiber $F_x$, defined by $\tilde x \mapsto [\gamma] \cdot \tilde x$. This is the monodromy action on $F_x$. The stabilizer of $\tilde{x}$ is $p_*\left(\pi_1\left(\tilde{X}, \tilde{x}\right)\right)$; that is, an element $[\gamma]$ fixes $\tilde{x} \in F$ if and only if $\tilde{\gamma}$, the lift of the loop $\gamma$, is still a loop.

In general, there could be two kinds of monodromy actions. There could be a curvature-like action, whereby $F_x$ is deformed slightly, in such a way that it can be continuously deformed back to the beginning. There could also be a discrete action, whereby $F_x$ is discontinuously deformed, in such a way that it cannot.

Let $\operatorname{Hom}(F_x)$ be the group of homeomorphisms of $F_x$, and let $\operatorname{Is}(F_x)$ be the subgroup of $\operatorname{Hom}(F_x)$ consisting of those homeomorphisms isotopic to the identity. That is, $\operatorname{Is}(F_x)$ is the component of $\operatorname{Hom}(F_x)$ that is path-connected to the identity:
$$\operatorname{Is}\left(F_x\right)=\left\{f \in \operatorname{Hom}\left(F_x\right) \mid \exists H: F_x \times[0,1] \rightarrow F_x, H_0=\mathrm{id}, H_1=f, H_t \text { all homeomorphisms }\right\} .$$
The image of the induced map $\pi_1(X,x) \to \operatorname{Hom}(F_x)/\operatorname{Is}(F_x)$ is the topological monodromy group. It describes the "discontinuous" part of the action of $\pi_1(X, x)$ on $F_x$.

As usual in algebraic topology, there is an algebraic version. The homomorphism $\pi_1(X, x) \to \operatorname{Aut}(H_*(F_x))$ into the automorphism group on the homology of $F_x$ is the algebraic monodromy. The image of this homomorphism is the (algebraic) monodromy group.

== Example ==
These ideas were first made explicit in complex analysis. In the process of analytic continuation, a function that is an analytic function $F(z)$ in some open subset $E$ of the punctured complex plane $\mathbb{C} \backslash \{0\}$ may be continued back into $E$, but with different values. For example, take

$$\begin{align}
F(z) &= \log(z) \\
E &= \{z\in \mathbb{C} \mid \operatorname{Re}(z)>0\}.
\end{align}$$

Then analytic continuation anti-clockwise round the circle

$$|z| = 1$$

will result in the return not to $F(z)$ but to

$$F(z) + 2\pi i.$$

In this case the monodromy group is the infinite cyclic group, and the covering space is the universal cover of the punctured complex plane. This cover can be visualized as the helicoid with parametric equations $(x, y, z) = (\rho \cos \theta, \rho \sin \theta, \theta)$ restricted to $\rho > 0$. The covering map is a vertical projection, in a sense collapsing the spiral in the obvious way to get a punctured plane.

== Differential equations in the complex domain ==
One important application is to differential equations, where a single solution may give further linearly independent solutions by analytic continuation. Linear differential equations defined in an open, connected set $S$ in the complex plane have a monodromy group, which (more precisely) is a linear representation of the fundamental group of $S$, summarising all the analytic continuations round loops within $S$. The inverse problem, of constructing the equation (with regular singularities), given a representation, is a Riemann–Hilbert problem.

For a regular (and in particular Fuchsian) linear system one usually chooses as generators of the monodromy group the operators $M_j$ corresponding to loops each of which circumvents just one of the poles of the system counterclockwise. If the indices $j$ are chosen in such a way that they increase from $1$ to $p+1$ when one circumvents the base point clockwise, then the only relation between the generators is the equality $M_1\cdots M_{p+1}=\operatorname{id}$. The Deligne–Simpson problem is the following realisation problem: For which tuples of conjugacy classes in $\operatorname{GL}(n,\mathbb{C})$ do there exist irreducible tuples of matrices $M_j$ from these classes satisfying the above relation? The problem has been formulated by Pierre Deligne and Carlos Simpson was the first to obtain results towards its resolution. An additive version of the problem about residua of Fuchsian systems has been formulated and explored by Vladimir Kostov. The problem has been considered by other authors for matrix groups other than $\operatorname{GL}(n,\mathbb{C})$ as well.

== Topological and geometric aspects ==
In the case of a covering map, we look at it as a special case of a fibration, and use the homotopy lifting property to "follow" paths on the base space $X$ (we assume it path-connected for simplicity) as they are lifted up into the cover $C$. If we follow round a loop based at $x$ in $X$, which we lift to start at $c$ above $x$, we'll end at some $c^*$ again above $x$; it is quite possible that $c \neq c^*$, and to code this one considers the action of the fundamental group $\pi_1(X, x)$ as a permutation group on the set of all $c$, as a monodromy group in this context.

In differential geometry, an analogous role is played by parallel transport. In a principal bundle $B$ over a smooth manifold $M$, a connection allows "horizontal" movement from fibers above $m$ in $M$ to adjacent ones. The effect when applied to loops based at $m$ is to define a holonomy group of translations of the fiber at $m$; if the structure group of $B$ is $G$, it is a subgroup of $G$ that measures the deviation of $B$ from the product bundle $M \times G$.

=== Monodromy groupoid and foliations ===
A path in the base has paths in the total space lifting it. Pushing along these paths gives the monodromy action from the fundamental groupoid.

Analogous to the fundamental groupoid it is possible to get rid of the choice of a base point and to define a monodromy groupoid. Here we consider (homotopy classes of) lifts of paths in the base space $X$ of a fibration $p:\tilde X\to X$. The result has the structure of a groupoid over the base space $X$. The advantage is that we can drop the condition of connectedness of $X$.

Moreover the construction can also be generalized to foliations: Consider $(M,\mathcal{F})$ a (possibly singular) foliation of $M$. Then for every path in a leaf of $\mathcal{F}$ we can consider its induced diffeomorphism on local transversal sections through the endpoints. Within a simply connected chart this diffeomorphism becomes unique and especially canonical between different transversal sections if we go over to the germ of the diffeomorphism around the endpoints. In this way it also becomes independent of the path (between fixed endpoints) within a simply connected chart and is therefore invariant under homotopy.

== Definition via Galois theory ==
Let $\mathbb{F}(x)$ denote the field of the rational functions in the variable $x$ over the field $\mathbb{F}$, which is the field of fractions of the polynomial ring $\mathbb{F}[x]$. An element $y = f(x)$ of $\mathbb{F}(x)$ determines a finite field extension $[\mathbb{F}(x) : \mathbb{F}(y)]$.

This extension is generally not Galois but has Galois closure $L(f)$. The associated Galois group of the extension $[L(f) : \mathbb{F}(y)]$ is called the monodromy group of $f$.

In the case of $\mathbb{F}=\mathbb{C}$ Riemann surface theory enters and allows for the geometric interpretation given above. In the case that the extension $[\mathbb{C}(x):\mathbb{C}(y)]$ is already Galois, the associated monodromy group is sometimes called a group of deck transformations.

This has connections with the Galois theory of covering spaces leading to the Riemann existence theorem.

== See also ==
- Braid group
- Monodromy matrix
- Monodromy theorem
- Mapping class group (of a punctured disk)
