= Fundamental matrix (linear differential equation) =

Matrix consisting of linearly independent solutions to a linear differential equation

In mathematics, a fundamental matrix of a system of n homogeneous linear ordinary differential equations
$$\dot{\mathbf{x}}(t) = A(t) \mathbf{x}(t)$$
is a matrix-valued function $\Psi(t)$ whose columns are linearly independent solutions of the system. Then every solution to the system can be written as $\mathbf{x}(t) = \Psi(t) \mathbf{c}$, for some constant vector $\mathbf{c}$ (written as a column vector of height n).

A matrix-valued function $\Psi$ is a fundamental matrix of $\dot{\mathbf{x}}(t) = A(t) \mathbf{x}(t)$ if and only if $\dot{\Psi}(t) = A(t) \Psi(t)$ and $\Psi(t)$ is a non-singular matrix for all $t$. Moreover, if the entries of $A(t)$ are continuous in $t$, any solution to $\dot{\Psi}(t) = A(t) \Psi(t)$ which is a non-singular matrix for any single value of $t$, is automatically a non-singular matrix at all other values of $t$. Thus in this case, to check that $\Psi$ is a fundamental matrix for this equation, it sufficient to check that it is non-singular at a single value of $t$.

Moreover, if there is at-least one choice of fundamental matrix for a given system, then for each choice of non-singular matrix $B$, there is exactly one fundamental matrix solution $\Psi$ such that $\Psi(0)=B$. The same result holds if $0$ is replaced with any fixed value $t_0$. Also, if $\Psi_0$ is any fundamental matrix for this equation, then for any non-singular matrix $C$, the matrix $\Psi(t)=\Psi_0(t)C$ is also a fundamental matrix. In particular, if $\Psi_0$ is any fixed fundamental solution for a given equation, then all other fundamental solutions for this equation are of the form $\Psi_0(t)C$.

== Control theory ==
The fundamental matrix is used to express the state-transition matrix, an essential component in the solution of a system of linear ordinary differential equations.

== See also ==
- Flow
- Linear differential equation
- Liouville's formula
- Systems of ordinary differential equations
