= Lamé function =

Solutions of Lamé's equation

In mathematics, a Lamé function, or ellipsoidal harmonic function, is a solution of Lamé's equation, a second-order ordinary differential equation. It was introduced in the paper (Gabriel Lamé 1837). Lamé's equation appears in the method of separation of variables applied to the Laplace equation in elliptic coordinates. In some special cases solutions can be expressed in terms of polynomials called Lamé polynomials.

== The Lamé equation ==
Lamé's equation is

$$\frac{d^2y}{dx^2} + (A+B\weierp(x))y  = 0,$$

where A and B are constants, and $\wp$ is the Weierstrass elliptic function. The most important case is when $B\weierp(x) = - \kappa^2 \operatorname{sn}^2x$, where $\operatorname{sn}$ is the elliptic sine function, and $\kappa^2 = n(n+1)k^2$ for an integer n and $k$ the elliptic modulus, in which case the solutions extend to meromorphic functions defined on the whole complex plane. For other values of B the solutions have branch points.

By changing the independent variable to $t$ with $t=\operatorname{sn} x$, Lamé's equation can also be rewritten in algebraic form as

$$\frac{d^2y}{dt^2} +\frac{1}{2}\left(\frac{1}{t-e_1}+\frac{1}{t-e_2}+\frac{1}{t-e_3}\right) \frac{dy}{dt} - \frac{A+Bt}{4(t-e_1)(t-e_2)(t-e_3)}y = 0,$$

which after a change of variable becomes a special case of Heun's equation.

A more general form of Lamé's equation is the ellipsoidal equation or ellipsoidal wave equation which can be written (observe we now write $\Lambda$, not $A$ as above)

$$\frac{d^2y}{dx^2} + (\Lambda - \kappa^2 \operatorname{sn}^2x - \Omega^2k^4 \operatorname{sn}^4x)y = 0,$$

where $k$ is the elliptic modulus of the Jacobian elliptic functions and $\kappa$ and $\Omega$ are constants. For $\Omega = 0$ the equation becomes the Lamé equation with $\Lambda = A$. For $\Omega = 0, k = 0, \kappa = 2h, \Lambda -2h^2 = \lambda, x= z \pm \frac{\pi}{2}$ the equation reduces to the Mathieu equation

$$\frac{d^2y}{dz^2} + (\lambda - 2h^2\cos 2z)y = 0.$$

The Weierstrassian form of Lamé's equation is quite unsuitable for calculation (as Arscott also remarks, p. 191). The most suitable form of the equation is that in Jacobian form, as above. The algebraic and trigonometric forms are also cumbersome to use. Lamé equations arise in quantum mechanics as equations of small fluctuations about classical solutions—called periodic instantons, bounces or bubbles—of Schrödinger equations for various periodic and anharmonic potentials.

== Asymptotic expansions ==
Asymptotic expansions of periodic ellipsoidal wave functions, and therewith also of Lamé functions, for large values of $\kappa$ have been obtained by Müller. The asymptotic expansion obtained by him for the eigenvalues $\Lambda$ is, with $q$ approximately an odd integer (and to be determined more precisely by boundary conditions – see below),

$$\begin{align}
\Lambda(q) = {} & q\kappa - \frac{1}{2^3}(1+k^2)(q^2+1) - \frac{q}{2^6\kappa}\{(1+k^2)^2(q^2+3)\\[6pt]
&- 4k^2(q^2+5)\}
{} -\frac{1}{2^{10}\kappa^2} \Big\{(1+k^2)^3(5q^4+34q^2+9)\\
& - 4k^2(1+k^2)(5q^4+34q^2+9)
{} - 384\Omega^2k^4(q^2+1)\Big\} - \cdots ,
\end{align}$$

(another (fifth) term not given here has been calculated by Müller, the first three terms have also been obtained by Ince). Observe terms are alternately even and odd in $q$ and $\kappa$ (as in the corresponding calculations for Mathieu functions, and oblate spheroidal wave functions and prolate spheroidal wave functions). With the following boundary conditions (in which $K(k)$ is the quarter period given by a complete elliptic integral)

$$\operatorname{Ec}(2K) = \operatorname{Ec}(0) = 0,\;\; \operatorname{Es}(2K) = \operatorname{Es}(0) = 0,$$

as well as (the prime meaning derivative)

$$(\operatorname{Ec})^'_{2K} = (\operatorname{Ec})^'_0 = 0, \;\; (\operatorname{Es})^'_{2K} = (\operatorname{Es})^'_0 = 0,$$

defining respectively the ellipsoidal wave functions

$$\operatorname{Ec}^{q_0}_n, \operatorname{Es}^{q_0+1}_n, \operatorname{Ec}^{q_0-1}_n, \operatorname{Es}^{q_0}_n$$

of periods $4K, 2K, 2K, 4K,$ and for $q_0=1,3,5, \ldots$ one obtains

$$\begin{align}
&& q-q_0 = \mp 2\sqrt{\frac{2}{\pi}}  \left( \frac{1+k}{1-k}\right)^{-\kappa/k} \left(\frac{8\kappa}
{1-k^2}\right)^{q_0/2}\frac{1}{[(q_0-1)/2]!} \times \qquad\qquad\qquad \\[6pt]
&& \times \left[ 1
- \frac{3(q^2_0+1)(1+k^2)}{2^5\kappa} + \cdots \right]. \qquad\qquad \quad
\end{align}$$

Here the upper sign refers to the solutions $\operatorname{Ec}$ and the lower to the solutions $\operatorname{Es}$. Finally expanding $\Lambda(q)$ about $q_0,$ one obtains

$$\begin{align}
\Lambda_{\pm}(q) \simeq {} & \Lambda(q_0) + (q-q_0)\left(\frac{\partial \Lambda}{\partial q} \right)_{q_0} + \cdots \\[6pt]
= {} & \Lambda(q_0) +(q-q_0)\kappa \left[1 - \frac{q_0(1+k^2)}{2^2\kappa} - \frac{1}{2^6\kappa^2}\{3(1+k^2)^2(q^2_0+1)
-4k^2(q^2_0+2q_0+5)\}+ \cdots\right] \\[6pt]
\simeq {} & \Lambda(q_0) \mp 2\kappa\sqrt{\frac{2}{\pi}} \left( \frac{1+k}{1-k} \right)^{-\kappa/k} \left( \frac{8\kappa}{1-k^2}\right)^{q_0/2} \frac{1}{[(q_0-1)/2]!} \Big[ 1 - \frac{1}{2^5\kappa}(1+k^2)(3q^2_0+8q_0+3) \\[6pt]
& {} + \frac{1}{3.2^{11}\kappa^2}\{3(1+k^2)^2(9q^4_0+8q^3_0-78q^2_0-88q_0-87) \\[6pt]
& {} + 128k^2(2q^3_0+9q^2_0+10q_0+15)\} - \cdots\Big].
\end{align}$$

In the limit of the Mathieu equation (to which the Lamé equation can be reduced) these expressions reduce to the corresponding expressions of the Mathieu case (as shown by Müller).

== Floquet theory ==
The Floquet theory of the Lamé equation describes solutions that are quasiperiodic with respect to a real period. In the Jacobi version of the Lamé equation (with $\operatorname{sn}^2(x,k)$), the potential has real period
$$T = 2K(k),$$
where $k$ is the elliptic modulus and $K(k)$ is the complete elliptic integral of the first kind.

The equation may be written in Schrödinger form as
$$Ly = Ey,\qquad L = -\frac{d^2}{dx^2} + g(g+1)V(x),$$
where $V(x)$ is an elliptic function In terms of the parameters used above, $E=A$ and $B=-g(g+1)$.

A Floquet solution is a nonzero solution satisfying
$$y(x+T)=\xi\,y(x)$$
for some constant $\xi$, called the Floquet multiplier. For each energy $E$, there are generally two such multipliers, related by $\xi \mapsto \xi^{-1}$.

Introducing the variable $\nu = \xi - \xi^{-1}$, the Floquet data define a two-sheeted covering of the energy line of the form
$$\nu^2 = \Delta(E)^2 - 4,$$
where $\Delta(E)$ is the trace of the monodromy matrix.

When $g$ is a nonnegative integer, there are only finitely many energy bands, intervals of the real $E$-line for which the solutions stay bounded. Then the equation is described as finite-gap. In this case the two-fold covering becomes algebraic, and the spectral curve is a hyperelliptic curve of genus $g$, given by
$$\nu^2 = R_{2g+1}(E),$$
where $R_{2g+1}$ is a polynomial of degree $2g+1$, called the Lamé spectral polynomial.
