= Periodic instantons =

Finite energy solutions in Euclidean spacetime

In quantum field theory, periodic instantons are finite energy solutions of Euclidean-time field equations which communicate (in the sense of quantum tunneling) between two turning points in the barrier of a potential and are therefore also known as bounces. Vacuum instantons, normally simply called instantons, are the corresponding zero energy configurations in the limit of infinite Euclidean time. For completeness we add that sphalerons are the field configurations at the very top of a potential barrier. Vacuum instantons carry a winding (or topological) number, the other configurations do not. Periodic instantons were discovered with the explicit solution of Euclidean-time field equations for double-well potentials and the cosine potential with non-vanishing energy and are explicitly expressible in terms of Jacobian elliptic functions (the generalization of trigonometrical functions). Periodic instantons describe the oscillations between two endpoints of a potential barrier between two potential wells. The frequency $\Omega$ of these oscillations or the tunneling between the two wells is related to the bifurcation or level splitting $\Delta E$ of the energies of states or wave functions related to the wells on either side of the barrier, i.e. $\Omega = \Delta E/\hbar$. One can also interpret this energy change as the energy contribution to the well energy on either side originating from the integral describing the overlap of the wave functions on either side in the domain of the barrier.

Evaluation of $\Delta E$ by the path integral method requires summation over an infinite number of widely separated pairs of periodic instantons -- this calculation is therefore said to be that in the dilute gas approximation.

Periodic instantons have meanwhile been found to occur in numerous theories and at various levels of complication. In particular they arise in investigations of the following topics.

1. Quantum mechanics and path integral treatment of periodic and anharmonic potentials.
2. Macroscopic spin systems (like ferromagnetic particles) with phase transitions at certain temperatures. The study of such systems was started by D.A. Garanin and E.M. Chudnovsky in the context of condensed matter physics, where half of the periodic instanton is called a thermon.
3. Two-dimensional abelian Higgs model and four-dimensional electro-weak theories.
4. Theories of Bose–Einstein condensation and related topics in which tunneling takes place between weakly-linked macroscopic condensates confined to double-well potential traps.
