= Landau–Zener formula =

Formula for the probability that a system will change between two energy states

Sketch of an avoided crossing. The graph represents the energies of the system along a parameter z (which may be vary in time). The dashed lines represent the energies of the diabatic states, which cross each other at z_{c}, and the full lines represent the energy of the adiabatic states (eigenvalues of the Hamiltonian).

The Landau–Zener formula is an analytic solution to the equations of motion governing the transition dynamics of a two-state quantum system, with a time-dependent semi-classical Hamiltonian varying such that the energy separation of the two states is a linear function of time. The formula, giving the probability of a non-adiabatic transition between the two adiabatic energy states, was published separately by Lev Landau, Clarence Zener, Ernst Stueckelberg, and Ettore Majorana, in 1932.

If the system starts, in the infinite past, in the lower energy eigenstate, we wish to calculate the probability of finding the system in the upper energy eigenstate in the infinite future (a so-called Landau–Zener transition). For infinitely slow variation of the energy difference (that is, a Landau–Zener velocity of zero), the adiabatic theorem tells us that no such transition will take place in absence of any external fields, as the system will always be in an instantaneous eigenstate of the Hamiltonian at every moment of time. At non-zero velocities, non-adiabatic transitions can occur with a probability approximated by the Landau–Zener formula.

== Conditions and approximation ==
Such transitions occur between states of the entire system; hence any description of the system must include all external influences, including collisions and external electric and magnetic fields. In order that the equations of motion for the system might be solved analytically, a set of simplifications are made, known collectively as the Landau–Zener approximation. The simplifications are as follows:

1. The perturbation parameter in the Hamiltonian is a known, linear function of time.
2. The energy separation of the diabatic states varies linearly with time.
3. The coupling in the diabatic Hamiltonian matrix is independent of time.

The first simplification makes this a semi-classical treatment. In the case of an atom in a magnetic field, the field strength becomes a classical variable which can be precisely measured during the transition. This requirement is quite restrictive as a linear change will not, in general, be the optimal profile to achieve the desired transition probability.

The second simplification allows us to make the substitution

$$\Delta E = E_2(t) - E_1(t) \equiv \alpha t, \,$$

where $E_1(t)$ and $E_2(t)$ are the energies of the two states at time t, given by the diagonal elements of the Hamiltonian matrix, and $\alpha$ is a constant. For the case of an atom in a magnetic field this corresponds to a linear change in magnetic field. For a linear Zeeman shift this follows directly from point 1.

The final simplification requires that the time–dependent perturbation does not couple the diabatic states; rather, the coupling must be due to a static deviation from a $1/r$ Coulomb potential, commonly described by a quantum defect.

== Formula ==
The details of Zener's solution are somewhat opaque, relying on a set of substitutions to put the equation of motion into the form of the Weber equation and using the known solution. A more transparent solution is provided by Curt Wittig using contour integration.

The key figure of merit in this approach is the Landau–Zener velocity:

$$v_{\rm LZ} = {\frac{\partial}{\partial t}|E_2 - E_1| \over \frac{\partial}{\partial q}|E_2 - E_1|} \approx \frac{dq}{dt},$$

where q is the perturbation variable (electric or magnetic field, molecular bond-length, or any other perturbation to the system), and $E_1$ and $E_2$ are the energies of the two diabatic (crossing) states. A large $v_{\rm LZ}$ results in a large diabatic transition probability and vice versa.

Using the Landau–Zener formula the probability, $P_{\rm D}$, of a diabatic transition is given by

$$\begin{align}
P_{\rm D} &= e^{-2\pi\Gamma}\\
\Gamma &= {a^2/\hbar \over \left|\frac{\partial}{\partial t}(E_2 - E_1)\right|} = {a^2/\hbar \over \left|\frac{dq}{dt}\frac{\partial}{\partial q}(E_2 - E_1)\right|}\\
&= {a^2 \over \hbar|\alpha|}
\end{align}$$

The quantity $a$ is the off-diagonal element of the two-level system's Hamiltonian coupling the bases, and as such it is half the distance between the two unperturbed eigenenergies at the avoided crossing, when $E_1 = E_2$.

== Generalizing to multistate models ==
The simplest generalization of the two-state Landau–Zener model is a multistate system with a Hamiltonian of the form

$$H(t)=A+Bt,$$

where A and B are Hermitian NxN matrices with time-independent elements. The goal of the multistate Landau–Zener theory is to determine elements of the scattering matrix and the transition probabilities between states of this model after evolution with such a Hamiltonian from negative infinite to positive infinite time. The transition probabilities are the absolute value squared of scattering matrix elements.

=== Exact solutions ===
There are exact formulas, called hierarchy constraints, that provide analytical expressions for special elements of the scattering matrix in any multi-state Landau–Zener model. Special cases of these relations are known as the Brundobler–Elser (BE) formula and the no-go theorem. Discrete symmetries often lead to constraints that reduce the number of independent elements of the scattering matrix.

There are also integrability conditions that, when they are satisfied, lead to exact expressions for the entire scattering matrices in multistate Landau–Zener models. Certain classes of these models are completely solvable:

==== Demkov–Osherov model ====
These describe a model whose dynamics are characterized by a single distinguished level which crosses every other level, themselves remaining parallel (i.e. mutually non-crossing). Surprisingly, the solution of this model is obtained by as a semiclassical approximation of precisely those solutions with independent crossings. This behaviour may be naturally generalized (see below) and can be observed in almost all Landau–Zener systems (provided we restrict ourselves to those systems with only finitely many interacting states).

==== Generalized bow-tie model ====
This model describes the case in which two (one in the degenerate case limit) levels are coupled to a set of diabatic states (which are otherwise non-interacting) which cross at precisely a single point.

==== Driven Tavis–Cummings model ====
This describes interaction of N spins-1/2 with a bosonic mode in a linearly time-dependent magnetic field and exhibits the richest dynamics among the known solved systems. Exhibiting combinatorial complexity, the dimension of its state vector space is growing exponentially with respect to the number of spins N.

The rich structure of such models is largely a consequence of the transition probabilities, which can be described in terms of q-deformed binomial statistics. Notably this solution has been utilized with success in experimental applications including the study of Bose-Einstein condensates.

==== Spin clusters interacting with time-dependent magnetic fields ====
These models also yield fairly rich solutions, partially attributable to their transition probabilities exhibiting a sensitivity to path interference effects in the semiclassical (independent crossing) approximation.

==== Reducible (Composite) multistate Landau–Zener models ====
This class, as their name suggests, may be decomposed into several spatially decoupled solutions with each being confined to certain subsets, these subsets in turn can be found by exploiting a symmetry transformation under which solutions reduces to known solvable models dynamics on each respective region.

The prototypical example is an arbitrary spin Hamiltonian $H=gS_x+btS_z$, where S_{z} and S_{x} are spin operators, and S>1/2; b and g are constant parameters. Famously the earliest known solvable system, which was discussed by Majorana in 1932, it was proceeded by other multistate models, e.g. a model consisting of a pair of degenerate level crossing. Similarly the solutions of a 1D quantum Ising chain in a linearly varying magnetic field can also be found in the category.

==== Landau–Zener transitions in infinite linear chains. ====
This class is unique in that its models are defined under a unique formalism in which they can be assumed to possess infinitely many interacting states. Although many of the models (such as the Tavis–Cummings model) in this category can be described in the natural fashion (i.e. as a limit model given by a converging sequence of certain finite size models) these do not exhaust this model class thereby suggesting the peculiar fact that there exist models whose dynamics are impossible to approximate with a sequence of models showing increasingly many interacting states.

For an example of the latter, the author in shows the existence of solvable infinite chains that exhibit nonzero couplings between pairs of states which are not minimally adjacent to one another.

== Study of noise ==
Applications of the Landau–Zener solution to the problems of quantum state preparation and manipulation with discrete degrees of freedom stimulated the study of noise and decoherence effects on the transition probability in a driven two-state system. Several compact analytical results have been derived to describe these effects, including the Kayanuma formula for a strong diagonal noise, and Pokrovsky–Sinitsyn formula for the coupling to a fast colored noise with off-diagonal components.

Using the Schwinger–Keldysh Green's function, a rather complete and comprehensive study on the effect of quantum noise in all parameter regimes were performed by Ao and Rammer in late 1980s, from weak to strong coupling, low to high temperature, slow to fast passage, etc. Concise analytical expressions were obtained in various limits, showing the rich behaviors of such problem. The effects of nuclear spin bath and heat bath coupling on the Landau–Zener process was explored by Sinitsyn and Prokof'ev and Pokrovsky and Sun, respectively.

Exact results in multistate Landau–Zener theory (no-go theorem and BE-formula) can be applied to Landau–Zener systems which are coupled to baths composed of infinite many oscillators and/or spin baths (dissipative Landau–Zener transitions). They provide exact expressions for transition probabilities averaged over final bath states if the evolution begins from the ground state at zero temperature, see in Ref. for oscillator baths and for universal results including spin baths in Ref.

== See also ==
- Nonadiabatic transition state theory
- Adiabatic theorem
- Bond softening
- Bond hardening
- Froissart–Stora equation
