= Jean-Claude Lorquet =

Jean-Claude Lorquet (born 19 September 1935) is a professor of Theoretical Chemistry at the University of Liège. He is member of the International Academy of Quantum Molecular Science and author of over 100 scientific papers.

Some of his students are also well known for their contribution to quantum chemistry and reactivity: Michèle Desouter-Lecomte, Bernard Leyh, Françoise Remacle.

Lorquet was born in Liège, Belgium.

== Important contributions ==
- Theory of mass spectra.
- Study of reaction paths and of dissociation mechanisms of electronically excited molecular ions.
- Nonadiabatic interactions.
- Avoided crossings and conical intersections.
- Transition probabilities between two coupled potential energy surfaces.
- Statistical calculation of rate constants of nonadiabatic reactions.
- Validity of statistical theories of unimolecular reactions under collision-free conditions.
- Study of intramolecular vibrational energy relaxation, of phase space sampling and of unimolecular laws of decay via autocorrelation functions.
- Occurrence of quantum effects in competitive unimolecular reactions.

== See also ==
- Nonadiabatic transition state theory
