= Remacle =

Remacle may refer to:

- Saint Remacle (fl. 625–663), Benedictine missionary bishop of the 7th century
- Éric Remacle (1960–2013), Belgian political scientist
- Françoise Remacle, Belgian chemist
- Jordan Remacle (born 1987), Belgian footballer
- Louis Remacle (1910–1999), Belgian linguist
