= Diabatic representation =

Type of representation of molecular wave functions

The diabatic representation as a mathematical tool for theoretical calculations of atomic collisions and of molecular interactions.

One of the guiding principles in modern chemical dynamics and spectroscopy is that the motion of the nuclei in a molecule is slow compared to that of its electrons. This is justified by the large disparity between the mass of an electron, and the typical mass of a nucleus and leads to the Born–Oppenheimer approximation and the idea that the structure and dynamics of a chemical species are largely determined by nuclear motion on potential energy surfaces.

The potential energy surfaces are obtained within the adiabatic or Born–Oppenheimer approximation. This corresponds to a representation of the molecular wave function where the variables corresponding to the molecular geometry and the electronic degrees of freedom are separated. The non separable terms are due to the nuclear kinetic energy terms in the molecular Hamiltonian and are said to couple the potential energy surfaces. Nearby an avoided crossing or conical intersection, these terms are substantive. Therefore one unitary transformation is performed from the adiabatic representation to the so-called diabatic representation in which the nuclear kinetic energy operator is diagonal. In this representation, the coupling is due to the electronic energy and is a scalar quantity that is significantly easier to estimate numerically.

In the diabatic representation, the potential energy surfaces are smoother, so that low order Taylor series expansions of the surface capture much of the complexity of the original system. However strictly diabatic states do not exist in the general case. Hence, diabatic potentials generated from transforming multiple electronic energy surfaces together are generally not exact. These can be called pseudo-diabatic potentials, but generally the term is not used unless it is necessary to highlight this subtlety. Hence, pseudo-diabatic potentials are synonymous with diabatic potentials.

== Applicability ==
The motivation to calculate diabatic potentials often occurs when the Born–Oppenheimer approximation breaks down, or is not justified for the molecular system under study. For these systems, it is necessary to go beyond the Born–Oppenheimer approximation. This is often the terminology used to refer to the study of nonadiabatic systems.

A well-known approach involves recasting the molecular Schrödinger equation into a set of coupled eigenvalue equations. This is achieved by expanding the exact wave function in terms of products of electronic and nuclear wave functions (adiabatic states) followed by integration over the electronic coordinates. The coupled operator equations thus obtained depend on nuclear coordinates only. Off-diagonal elements in these equations are nuclear kinetic energy terms. A diabatic transformation of the adiabatic states replaces these off-diagonal kinetic energy terms by potential energy terms. Sometimes, this is called the "adiabatic-to-diabatic transformation", abbreviated ADT.

== Diabatic transformation of two electronic surfaces ==
In order to introduce the diabatic transformation, assume that only two Potential Energy Surfaces (PES), 1 and 2, approach each other and that all other surfaces are well separated; the argument can be generalized to more surfaces. Let the collection of electronic coordinates be indicated by $\mathbf{r}$, while $\mathbf{R}$ indicates dependence on nuclear coordinates. Thus, assume $E_1(\mathbf{R}) \approx E_2(\mathbf{R})$ with corresponding orthonormal electronic eigenstates $\chi_1(\mathbf{r};\mathbf{R})\,$ and $\chi_2(\mathbf{r};\mathbf{R})\,$. In the absence of magnetic interactions these electronic states, which depend parametrically on the nuclear coordinates, may be taken to be real-valued functions.

The nuclear kinetic energy is a sum over nuclei A with mass M_{A},

$$T_\mathrm{n} = \sum_{A} \sum_{\alpha=x,y,z} \frac{P_{A\alpha} P_{A\alpha}}{2M_A}
\quad\mathrm{with}\quad
P_{A\alpha} = -i \nabla_{A\alpha} \equiv -i \frac{\partial\quad}{\partial R_{A\alpha}}.$$

(Atomic units are used here). By applying the Leibniz rule for differentiation, the matrix elements of $T_{\textrm{n}}$ are (where coordinates are suppressed for clarity):

$$\mathrm{T_n}(\mathbf{R})_{k'k}
\equiv \langle \chi_{k'} | T_n | \chi_k\rangle_{(\mathbf{r})}
= \delta_{k'k} T_{\textrm{n}}
+ \sum_{A,\alpha}\frac{1}{M_A} \langle\chi_{k'}|\big(P_{A\alpha}\chi_k\big)\rangle_{(\mathbf{r})} P_{A\alpha} + \langle\chi_{k'}|\big(T_\mathrm{n}\chi_k\big)\rangle_{(\mathbf{r})}.$$

The subscript ${(\mathbf{r})}$ indicates that the integration inside the bracket is over electronic coordinates only. Let us further assume that all off-diagonal matrix elements $\mathrm{T_n}(\mathbf{R})_{kp} = \mathrm{T_n}(\mathbf{R})_{pk}$ may be neglected except for k = 1 and p = 2. Upon making the expansion

$$\Psi(\mathbf{r},\mathbf{R}) = \chi_1(\mathbf{r};\mathbf{R})\Phi_1(\mathbf{R})+
\chi_2(\mathbf{r};\mathbf{R})\Phi_2(\mathbf{R}),$$

the coupled Schrödinger equations for the nuclear part take the form (see the article Born–Oppenheimer approximation)

  
    
      
        
          
            (
            
              
                
                  
                    E
                    
                      1
                    
                  
                  (
                  
                    R
                  
                  )
                  +
                  
                    
                      T
                      
                        n
                      
                    
                  
                  (
                  
                    R
                  
                  
                    )
                    
                      11
                    
                  
                
                
                  
                    
                      T
                      
                        n
                      
                    
                  
                  (
                  
                    R
                  
                  
                    )
                    
                      12
                    
                  
                
              
              
                
                  
                    
                      T
                      
                        n
                      
                    
                  
                  (
                  
                    R
                  
                  
                    )
                    
                      21
                    
                  
                
                
                  
                    E
                    
                      2
                    
                  
                  (
                  
                    R
                  
                  )
                  +
                  
                    
                      T
                      
                        n
                      
                    
                  
                  (
                  
                    R
                  
                  
                    )
                    
                      22
                    
                  
                
              
            
            )
          
        
        
          Φ
        
        (
        
          R
        
        )
        =
        E
        
        
          Φ
        
        (
        
          R
        
        )
        
        
          w
          i
          t
          h
        
        
        
          Φ
        
        (
        
          R
        
        )
        ≡
        
          
            (
            
              
                
                  
                    Φ
                    
                      1
                    
                  
                  (
                  
                    R
                  
                  )
                
              
              
                
                  
                    Φ
                    
                      2
                    
                  
                  (
                  
                    R
                  
                  )
                
              
            
            )
          
        
        .
      
    
    {\displaystyle {\begin{pmatrix}E_{1}(\mathbf {R} )+\mathrm {T_{n}} (\mathbf {R} )_{11}&\mathrm {T_{n}} (\mathbf {R} )_{12}\\\mathrm {T_{n}} (\mathbf {R} )_{21}&E_{2}(\mathbf {R} )+\mathrm {T_{n}} (\mathbf {R} )_{22}\\\end{pmatrix}}{\boldsymbol {\Phi }}(\mathbf {R} )=E\,{\boldsymbol {\Phi }}(\mathbf {R} )\quad \mathrm {with} \quad {\boldsymbol {\Phi }}(\mathbf {R} )\equiv {\begin{pmatrix}\Phi _{1}(\mathbf {R} )\\\Phi _{2}(\mathbf {R} )\\\end{pmatrix}}.}
  

In order to remove the problematic off-diagonal kinetic energy terms, define two new orthonormal states by a diabatic transformation of the adiabatic states $\chi_{1}\,$ and $\chi_{2}\,$

$$\begin{pmatrix}
\varphi_1(\mathbf{r};\mathbf{R}) \\
\varphi_2(\mathbf{r};\mathbf{R}) \\
\end{pmatrix}
=
\begin{pmatrix}
\cos\gamma(\mathbf{R}) & \sin\gamma(\mathbf{R}) \\
-\sin\gamma(\mathbf{R}) & \cos\gamma(\mathbf{R}) \\
\end{pmatrix}
\begin{pmatrix}
\chi_1(\mathbf{r};\mathbf{R}) \\
\chi_2(\mathbf{r};\mathbf{R}) \\
\end{pmatrix}$$

where $\gamma(\mathbf{R})$ is the diabatic angle. Transformation of the matrix of nuclear momentum $\langle\chi_{k'}|\big(P_{A\alpha}\chi_k\big)\rangle_{(\mathbf{r})}$ for $k', k =1,2$ gives for diagonal matrix elements

$$\langle{\varphi_k} |\big( P_{A\alpha} \varphi_k\big) \rangle_{(\mathbf{r})} = 0 \quad\textrm{for}\quad k=1, \, 2.$$

These elements are zero because $\varphi_k$ is real and $P_{A\alpha}\,$ is Hermitian and pure-imaginary. The off-diagonal elements of the momentum operator satisfy,

$$\langle{\varphi_2} |\big( P_{A\alpha}\varphi_1\big) \rangle_{(\mathbf{r})} = \big(P_{A\alpha}\gamma(\mathbf{R}) \big) + \langle\chi_2| \big(P_{A\alpha} \chi_1\big)\rangle_{(\mathbf{r})}.$$

Assume that a diabatic angle $\gamma(\mathbf{R})$ exists, such that to a good approximation

$$\big(P_{A\alpha}\gamma(\mathbf{R})\big)+ \langle\chi_2|\big(P_{A\alpha} \chi_1\big) \rangle_{(\mathbf{r})} = 0$$

i.e., $\varphi_1$ and $\varphi_2$ diagonalize the 2 x 2 matrix of the nuclear momentum. By the definition of Smith $\varphi_1$ and $\varphi_2$ are diabatic states. (Smith was the first to define this concept; earlier the term diabatic was used somewhat loosely by Lichten).

By a small change of notation these differential equations for $\gamma(\mathbf{R})$ can be rewritten in the following more familiar form:

$$F_{A\alpha}(\mathbf{R}) = - \nabla_{A\alpha} V(\mathbf{R})
\qquad\mathrm{with}\;\; V(\mathbf{R}) \equiv \gamma(\mathbf{R})\;\;\mathrm{and}\;\;F_{A\alpha}(\mathbf{R})\equiv
\langle\chi_2|\big(iP_{A\alpha} \chi_1\big) \rangle_{(\mathbf{r})} .$$

It is well known that the differential equations have a solution (i.e., the "potential" V exists) if and only if the vector field ("force") $F_{A\alpha}(\mathbf{R})$ is irrotational,

$$\nabla_{A\alpha} F_{B\beta}(\mathbf{R}) - \nabla_{B \beta} F_{A\alpha}(\mathbf{R}) = 0.$$

It can be shown that these conditions are rarely ever satisfied, so that a strictly diabatic transformation rarely ever exists. It is common to use approximate functions $\gamma(\mathbf{R})$ leading to pseudo diabatic states.

Under the assumption that the momentum operators are represented exactly by 2 x 2 matrices, which is consistent with neglect of off-diagonal elements other than the (1,2) element and the assumption of "strict" diabaticity, it can be shown that

$$\langle \varphi_{k'} | T_n | \varphi_k  \rangle_{(\mathbf{r})}  = \delta_{k'k} T_n.$$

On the basis of the diabatic states the nuclear motion problem takes the following generalized Born–Oppenheimer form

  
    
      
        
          
            (
            
              
                
                  
                    T
                    
                      
                        n
                      
                    
                  
                  +
                  
                    
                      
                        
                          E
                          
                            1
                          
                        
                        (
                        
                          R
                        
                        )
                        +
                        
                          E
                          
                            2
                          
                        
                        (
                        
                          R
                        
                        )
                      
                      2
                    
                  
                
                
                  0
                
              
              
                
                  0
                
                
                  
                    T
                    
                      
                        n
                      
                    
                  
                  +
                  
                    
                      
                        
                          E
                          
                            1
                          
                        
                        (
                        
                          R
                        
                        )
                        +
                        
                          E
                          
                            2
                          
                        
                        (
                        
                          R
                        
                        )
                      
                      2
                    
                  
                
              
            
            )
          
        
        
          
            
              Φ
              ~
            
          
        
        (
        
          R
        
        )
        +
        
          
            
              
                
                  E
                  
                    2
                  
                
                (
                
                  R
                
                )
                −
                
                  E
                  
                    1
                  
                
                (
                
                  R
                
                )
              
              2
            
          
        
        
          
            (
            
              
                
                  cos
                  ⁡
                  2
                  γ
                
                
                  sin
                  ⁡
                  2
                  γ
                
              
              
                
                  sin
                  ⁡
                  2
                  γ
                
                
                  −
                  cos
                  ⁡
                  2
                  γ
                
              
            
            )
          
        
        
          
            
              Φ
              ~
            
          
        
        (
        
          R
        
        )
        =
        E
        
          
            
              Φ
              ~
            
          
        
        (
        
          R
        
        )
        .
      
    
    {\displaystyle {\begin{pmatrix}T_{\mathrm {n} }+{\frac {E_{1}(\mathbf {R} )+E_{2}(\mathbf {R} )}{2}}&0\\0&T_{\mathrm {n} }+{\frac {E_{1}(\mathbf {R} )+E_{2}(\mathbf {R} )}{2}}\end{pmatrix}}{\tilde {\boldsymbol {\Phi }}}(\mathbf {R} )+{\tfrac {E_{2}(\mathbf {R} )-E_{1}(\mathbf {R} )}{2}}{\begin{pmatrix}\cos 2\gamma &\sin 2\gamma \\\sin 2\gamma &-\cos 2\gamma \end{pmatrix}}{\tilde {\boldsymbol {\Phi }}}(\mathbf {R} )=E{\tilde {\boldsymbol {\Phi }}}(\mathbf {R} ).}
  

The off-diagonal elements depend on the diabatic angle and electronic energies only. The surfaces $E_{1}(\mathbf{R})$ and $E_{2}(\mathbf{R})$ are adiabatic PESs obtained from clamped nuclei electronic structure calculations and $T_\mathrm{n}\,$ is the usual nuclear kinetic energy operator defined above. Finding approximations for $\gamma(\mathbf{R})$ is the remaining problem before a solution of the Schrödinger equations can be attempted. Much of the current research in quantum chemistry is devoted to this determination. Once $\gamma(\mathbf{R})$ has been found and the coupled equations have been solved, the final vibronic wave function in the diabatic approximation is

$$\Psi(\mathbf{r},\mathbf{R}) = \varphi_1(\mathbf{r};\mathbf{R})\tilde\Phi_1(\mathbf{R})+
\varphi_2(\mathbf{r};\mathbf{R})\tilde\Phi_2(\mathbf{R}).$$

== Adiabatic-to-diabatic transformation ==
Here, in contrast to previous treatments, the non-Abelian case is considered.

Felix Smith in his article considers the adiabatic-to-diabatic transformation (ADT) for a multi-state system but a single coordinate, $\mathrm{R_{A\alpha}}$. In Diabatic, the ADT is defined for a system of two coordinates $\mathrm{R_{A\alpha}}$ and $\mathrm{R_{B\beta}}$, but it is restricted to two states. Such a system is defined as Abelian and the ADT matrix is expressed in terms of an angle, $\gamma$ (see Comment below), known also as the ADT angle. In the present treatment a system is assumed that is made up of M (> 2) states defined for an N-dimensional configuration space, where N = 2 or N > 2. Such a system is defined as non-Abelian. To discuss the non-Abelian case the equation for the just mentioned ADT angle, $\gamma$ (see Diabatic), is replaced by an equation for the MxM, ADT matrix, $\mathbf{A}$:

$$\nabla \mathbf{ A + FA = 0}$$

where $\mathbf{F}$ is the force-matrix operator, introduced in Diabatic, also known as the Non-Adiabatic Coupling Transformation (NACT) matrix:

$$\ \mathbf{F}_{jk} = \langle \chi_j\mid \nabla \chi_k\rangle;\qquad j,k=1,2,\ldots,M$$

Here $\nabla$ is the N-dimensional (nuclear) grad-operator:

$$\nabla = \left\{ \frac{\partial\quad}{\partial q_{1}},\quad  \frac{\partial\quad}{\partial q_{2}} , \ldots, \frac{\partial\quad}{\partial q_N} \right\}$$

and $|\chi_k( \mathbf{r\mid q} ) \rangle;\ k= 1,M$, are the electronic adiabatic eigenfunctions which depend explicitly on the electronic coordinates $\mathbf{r}$ and parametrically on the nuclear coordinates $\mathbf{q}$.

To derive the matrix $\mathbf{A}$ one has to solve the above given first order differential equation along a specified contour $\Gamma$. This solution is then applied to form the diabatic potential matrix $\mathbf{W}$:

$$\mathbf{W} = \mathbf{A}^{*}\mathbf{uA}$$

where $\mathbf{u}_j$ ; j = 1, M are the Born–Oppenheimer adiabatic potentials. In order for $\mathbf{W}$ to be single-valued in configuration space, $\mathbf{A}$ has to be analytic and in order for $\mathbf{A}$ to be analytic (excluding the pathological points), the components of the vector matrix, $\mathbf{F}$, have to satisfy the following equation:

$$G_{{q_i }{q_j}}=  \frac{{\partial}\mathbf{F}_{q_i}}{\partial q_{j}} - \frac{{\partial}\mathbf{F}_{q_j}}{\partial q_i} - \left[ \mathbf{F}_{q_i} , \mathbf{F}_{q_j} \right] = 0.$$

where $\mathbf{G}$ is a tensor field. This equation is known as the non-Abelian form of the Curl Equation. A solution of the ADT matrix $\mathbf{A}$ along the contour $\Gamma$ can be shown to be of the form:

$$\mathbf{A}\left( \mathbf{q}|\Gamma \right) = \hat{P} \exp$$

$$\left( - \int_\mathbf{q_0}^\mathbf{q}\mathbf{F} \left( \mathbf{q'}\mid \Gamma \right) \cdot d\mathbf{q'}\right)$$

(see also Geometric phase). Here $\hat{P}$ is an ordering operator, the dot stands for a scalar product and $\mathbf{q}$ and $\mathbf{q_0}$ are two points on $\Gamma$.

A different type of solution is based on quasi-Euler angles according to which any $\mathbf{A}$-matrix can be expressed as a product of Euler matrices. For instance in case of a tri-state system this matrix can be presented as a product of three such matrices, $\mathbf{Q}_{j}(\gamma_{ij})$ (i < j = 2, 3) where e.g. $\mathbf{Q}_{13} (\gamma_{13})$ is of the form:

$$\mathbf{Q}_{13} = \begin{pmatrix} \cos \gamma_{13} & 0 & \sin\gamma_{13}\\0 & 1 & 0\\
-\sin\gamma_{13} & 0 & \cos\gamma_{13} \end{pmatrix}$$

The product $\mathbf{A} = \mathbf{Q}_{kl} \mathbf{Q}_{mn} \mathbf{Q}_{pq}$ which can be written in any order, is substituted in Eq. (1) to yield three first order differential equations for the three ${\gamma}_{ij}$-angles where two of these equations are coupled and the third stands on its own. Thus, assuming: $\mathbf{A} = \mathbf{Q}_{12} \mathbf{Q}_{23} \mathbf{Q}_{13}$ the two coupled equations for ${\gamma}_{12}$ and ${\gamma}_{23}$ are:

$$\nabla \gamma_{12} = -F_{12} -
\tan{\gamma}_{23} (- F_{13} \cos\gamma_{12} + F_{23}\sin \gamma_{12})$$

$$\nabla \gamma_{23} = - (F_{23} \cos\gamma_{12} + F_{13} \sin\gamma_{12})$$

whereas the third equation (for $\gamma_{13}$) becomes an ordinary (line) integral:

$$\nabla \gamma_{13} =(\cos\gamma_{23})^{-1}(- F_{13}\cos\gamma_{12} + F_{23}\sin\gamma_{12})$$

expressed solely in terms of $\gamma_{12}$ and $\gamma_{23}$.

Similarly, in case of a four-state system $\mathbf{A}$ is presented as a product of six 4 x 4 Euler matrices (for the six quasi-Euler angles) and the relevant six differential equations form one set of three coupled equations, whereas the other three become, as before, ordinary line integrals.

== A comment concerning the two-state (Abelian) case ==
Since the treatment of the two-state case as presented in Diabatic raised numerous doubts we consider it here as a special case of the Non-Abelian case just discussed. For this purpose we assume the 2 × 2 ADT matrix $\mathrm{A}$ to be of the form:

$$\mathrm{A} = \begin{pmatrix}\cos\gamma & - \sin\gamma\\\sin\gamma & \cos\gamma \end{pmatrix}$$

Substituting this matrix in the above given first order differential equation (for $\mathrm{A}$) we get, following a few algebraic rearrangements, that the angle $\gamma$ fulfills the corresponding first order differential equation as well as the subsequent line integral:

$$\nabla \mathbf{ \gamma + F_{12} = 0 }  \cdot \Longrightarrow \cdot\gamma\left( \mathbf{q}\mid \Gamma \right) = -\int_\mathbf{q_0}^\mathbf{q}\mathbf{F}_{12} \left( \mathbf{q'}\mid \Gamma \right) \cdot d\mathbf{q'}$$

where $\mathrm{F}_{12}$ is the relevant NACT matrix element, the dot stands for a scalar product and $\Gamma$ is a chosen contour in configuration space (usually a planar one) along which the integration is performed. The line integral yields meaningful results if and only if the corresponding (previously derived) Curl-equation is zero for every point in the region of interest (ignoring the pathological points).
