= Diabatic =

The term diabatic can refer to:

- Diabatic representation, a mathematical tool for theoretical calculations of atomic and molecular interactions
- in general, the opposite of the term adiabatic

== See also ==
- Diabetic
