= Bond softening =

Bond softening is an effect of reducing the strength of a chemical bond by strong laser fields. To make this effect significant, the strength of the electric field in the laser light has to be comparable with the electric field the bonding electron "feels" from the nuclei of the molecule. Such fields are typically in the range of 1–10 V/Å, which corresponds to laser intensities 10^{13}–10^{15} W/cm^{2}. Nowadays, these intensities are routinely achievable from table-top Ti:Sapphire lasers.

== Theory ==
Theoretical description of bond softening can be traced back to early work on dissociation of diatomic molecules in intense laser fields. While the quantitative description of this process requires quantum mechanics, it can be understood qualitatively using quite simple models.

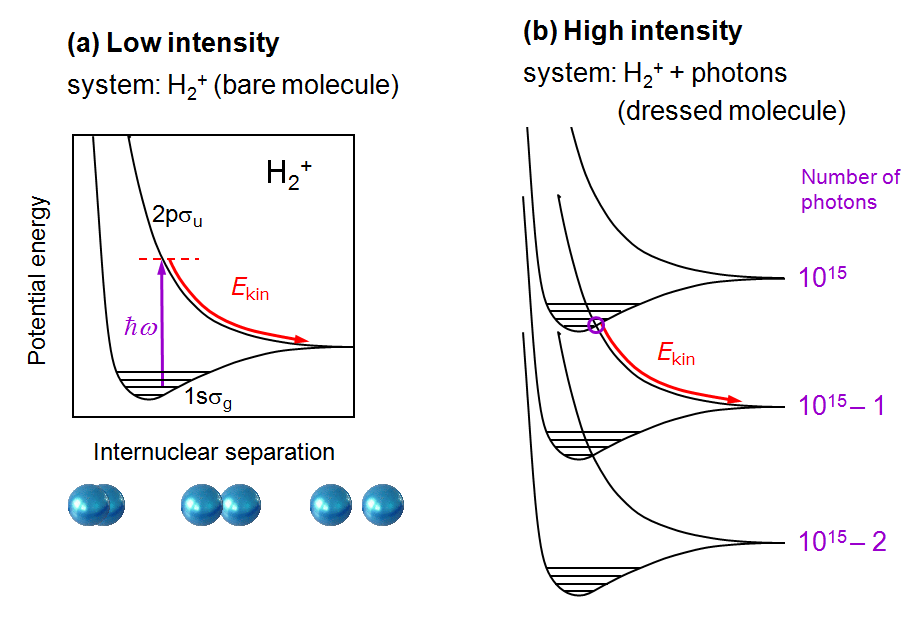
Figure 1: Two theoretical models of a molecule interacting with laser field. At low intensity (a) it is convenient to plot molecular energy curves and indicate photon transitions with vertical arrows. At high intensity (b) it is more appropriate to "dress" the molecular curves in photons and consider photon transitions at the curve crossings.

=== Low-intensity description ===
Consider the simplest diatomic molecule, the H_{2}^{+} ion. The ground state of this molecule is bonding and the first excited state is antibonding. This means that when we plot the potential energy of the molecule (i.e. the average electrostatic energy of the two protons and the electron plus the kinetic energy of the latter) as the function of proton-proton separation, the ground state has a minimum but the excited state is repulsive (see Fig. 1a). Normally, the molecule is in the ground state, in one of the lowest vibrational levels (marked by horizontal lines).

In the presence of light, the molecule may absorb a photon (violet arrow), provided its frequency matches the energy difference between the ground and the excited states. The excited state is unstable and the molecule dissociates within femtoseconds into hydrogen atom and a proton releasing kinetic energy (red arrow). This is the usual description of photon absorption, which works well at low intensity. At high intensity, however, the interaction of the light with the molecule is so strong that the potential energy curves become distorted. To take this distortion into account requires "dressing" the molecule in photons.

=== Dressing in photons at high intensity ===
At high laser intensity absorptions and stimulated emissions of photons are so frequent that the molecule cannot be regarded as a system separate from the laser field; the molecule is "dressed" in photons forming a single system. However, the number of photons in this system varies when photons are absorbed and emitted. Therefore, to plot the energy diagram of the dressed molecule, we need to repeat the energy curves at each number of photons. The number of photons is very large but only a few curve repetitions need to be considered in this very tall ladder, as shown in Fig. 1b.

In the dressed model, photon absorption (and emission) is no longer represented by vertical transitions. As the energy must be conserved, photon absorption occurs at the curve crossings. For example, if the molecule is in the ground electronic state with 10^{15} photons present, it can jump to the repulsive state absorbing a photon at the curve crossing (violet circle) and dissociate to the 10^{15}-1 photon limit (red arrow). This "curve jumping" is in fact continuous and can be explained in terms of avoided crossings.

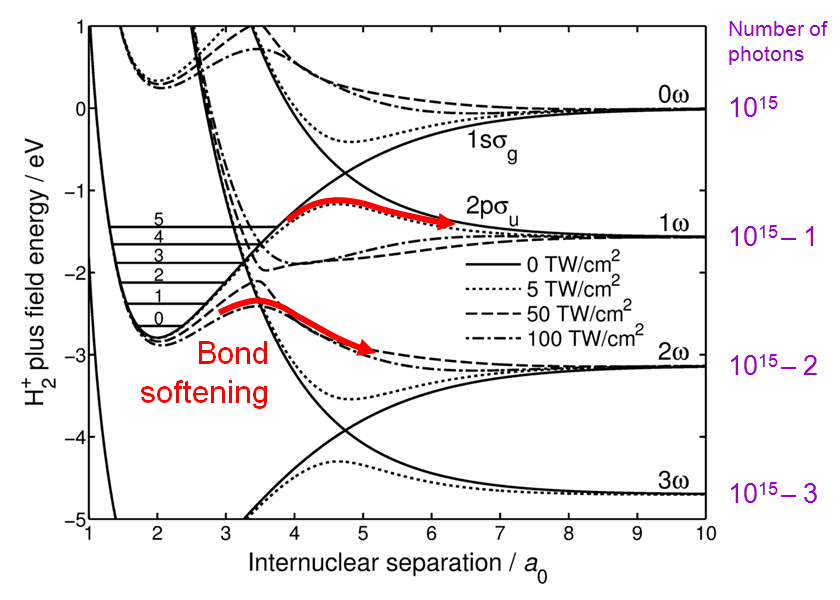
Figure 2: Distortion of molecular energy curves dressed in photons for increasing laser intensity. Curve crossings become anticrossings, which induces bond softening. The distorted curves have been calculated from undistorted ones in Matlab using Hamiltonian diagonalisation.

=== Energy curve distortion ===
When strong laser field perturbs the molecule, its energy levels are no longer the same as in the absence of the field. To calculate the new energy levels, the perturbation must be included as off-diagonal elements of the Hamiltonian, which has to be diagonalised. In consequence, the crossings turn into anticrossings and the higher the laser intensity, the larger the gap of the anticrossing as shown in Fig. 2. The molecule can dissociate along the lower branch of the anticrossings as indicated by the red arrows.

The top arrow represents one photon absorption, which is a continuous process. In the region of the anticrossing the molecule is in a superposition of the ground and the excited states, continuously exchanging energy with the laser field. As the internuclear separation increases, the molecule absorbs energy and the electronic wavefunction evolves to the antibonding state on the femtosecond timescale. The H_{2}^{+} ion dissociates to the 1ω limit.

The bottom arrow represents a process initiated at the 3-photon gap. As the system passes through this gap, the 1-photon gap is wide open and the system slides along the top branch of the 1-photon anticrossing. The molecule dissociates to the 2ω limit via absorption of 3 photons followed by re-emission of 1 photon. (One-step even-photon absorptions and emissions are forbidden by the symmetry of the system.)

The anticrossing curves are adiabatic, i.e. they are accurate only for infinitely slow transitions. When the dissociation is fast and the gap is small, a diabatic transition may occur where the system ends up on the other branch of the anticrossing. The probability of such a transition is described by the Landau–Zener formula. When applied to the dissociation through the 3-photon gap, the formula gives a small probability of the H_{2}^{+} molecular ion ending up in the 3ω dissociation limit without emitting any photons.

== Experimental confirmation ==
The "bond softening" phrase was coined by Phil Bucksbaum in 1990 at the time of its experimental observation. A Nd:YAG laser was used to generate intense pulses of about 80 ps duration at the second harmonic of 532 nm. In a vacuum chamber, the pulses were focused on molecular hydrogen under low pressure (about 10^{−6} mbar) inducing ionization and dissociation. The kinetic energy of protons was measured in a time-of-flight (TOF) spectrometer. The proton TOF spectra revealed three peaks of kinetic energy spaced by a half of the photon energy. As the neutral H atom was taking the other half of the photon energy, this was an unambiguous confirmation of the bond softening process leading to the 1ω, 2ω and 3ω dissociation limits. Such a process which absorbs more than the minimum number of photons is known as above-threshold dissociation.

A comprehensive review puts the mechanism of bond softening in a broader research context. Anticrossings of diatomic energy curves have many similarities to the conical intersections of energy surfaces in polyatomic molecules.
