= Nonadiabatic transition state theory =

Nonadiabatic transition state theory (NA-TST) is a powerful tool to predict rates of chemical reactions from a computational standpoint. NA-TST was introduced in 1988 by Prof. J.C. Lorquet. In general, all of the assumptions used in traditional transition state theory (TST) are also used in NA-TST but with some corrections. First, a spin-forbidden reaction proceeds through the minimum energy crossing point (MECP) rather than through a transition state (TS). Second, unlike TST, the probability of transition is not equal to unity during the reaction and is treated as a function of internal energy associated with the reaction coordinate. At this stage non-relativistic couplings responsible for mixing between states are a driving force of transition. For example, the larger spin-orbit coupling at MECP the larger the probability of transition. NA-TST can be reduced to the traditional TST in the limit of unit probability.
