= Françoise Remacle =

Belgian theoretical physical chemist

Françoise Remacle is a Belgian theoretical physical chemist whose research topics have included fast time scales in chemistry, the chemical interactions of quantum dots, and DNA computing. She is a director of research for the Belgian National Fund for Scientific Research, and head of the Theoretical Physical Chemistry group at the University of Liège.

== Education and career ==
Remacle was a student at the University of Liège, earning an undergraduate degree in chemistry in 1986, and a Ph.D. in 1990 under the supervision of Jean-Claude Lorquet. She also earned a habilitation from the University of Liège in 2001.

After postdoctoral research at the Hebrew University of Jerusalem, she became a researcher (chargé de recherches) for the National Fund for Scientific Research, affiliated with the University of Liège, in 1993. She was promoted to director of research in 2005.

== Recognition ==
Remacle was the 1996 winner of the Prix Louis d’Or of the Société Royale des Sciences de Liège. In 2009 she was elected as a Fellow of the American Physical Society (APS), after a nomination from the APS Division of Atomic, Molecular & Optical Physics, "for studies of systems with a high density of states such as Rydberg systems, quantum dot arrays and peptides, and their utilization in molecular information processing and attoscience". In 2017, the European Physical Society named her as the recipient of their EPS Emmy Noether Distinction for Women in Physics, "for ground breaking contributions to interdisciplinary domains bridging Physics, Chemistry, and Biology, for her leading role in European and International research projects and for her excellent mentoring activity".
