= Shark (disambiguation) =

A shark is a cartilaginous, usually carnivorous fish.

Shark, Sharks or The Shark may also refer to:

== Arts and entertainment ==
=== Characters ===
- Shark (comics), the name of several characters in DC Comics
- King Shark, a supervillain from DC Comics
- Shark, in the TV series 12 oz. Mouse
- Shark, in the TV show WordWorld

=== Film and television ===
- Sharks (film), a 1917 French silent crime film
- The Shark (1920 film), a lost American silent film
- The Shark (1930 film), a French film
- The Sharks (film), a 2019 Uruguayan film
- Shark!, a 1969 American action film
- Shark (2000 film), a horror film
- Shark (2021 film), an Australian short film
- Shark (South Korean TV series), 2013
- Shark (American TV series), 2006–2008
- Shark (British TV series), 2015
- Shark: Mind of a Demon, a 2006 TV documentary
- "Sharks", residential entrepreneurs on Shark Tank

=== Literature ===
- Shark (novel), by Will Self, 2014
- The Sharks (novel), by Jens Bjørneboe, 1974
- "Shark", a short story by Edward Bryant, 1973
- The Shark, a Witch Creek Road Season 2 storyline by Garth Matthams and Kenan Halilović, 2021

=== Music ===
- Sharks (punk band), a British punk rock band formed in 2007
- Sharks (rock band), a British rock band formed in 1972
- The Sharks (band), an American new wave band
- Sharks (album), by UFO, 2002
- "Shark", a song by Oh Wonder from the 2015 album Oh Wonder
- "Shark", a song by Throwing Muses from the 1996 album Limbo
- "Sharks", a song by Test Icicles from the 2005 album For Screening Purposes Only
- "Sharks", a song by Red Fang from the 2009 album Red Fang
- "Sharks" (Imagine Dragons song), 2022
- "Sharks" (Lil Wayne, Jelly Roll and Big Sean song), 2025
- "Sharks", a song by The Warning from the 2024 album Keep Me Fed
- WQAM-FM, a radio station licensed to Miramar, Florida, US and called "104.3 The Shark" from 2015 to 2025
- WRXZ, a radio station licensed to Briarcliffe Acres, South Carolina, US and called The Shark in the 1990s
- WWSK, a radio station licensed to Smithtown, New York, US and called The Shark since 2012

=== Other uses in arts and entertainment ===
- The Headington Shark, or just The Shark, a 1986 sculpture in Headington, Oxford, England
- Sharks!, a public art installation in London, England
- Shark, an artwork by David Černý

== Businesses, organisations and brand names ==
- Shark (helmet manufacturer), France
- Shark Energy, a drink
- Showing Animals Respect and Kindness (SHARK), an animal rights organization
- Shark, a brand of vacuum cleaner manufactured and marketed by SharkNinja

== Military ==
- Blackburn Shark, a British carrier-borne torpedo bomber aircraft
- HMS Shark, the name of several Royal Navy ships
- USS Shark, the name of several U.S. Navy ships
- The Sharks (Royal Navy), a helicopter display team 1975–1992
- PNS Hangor (S131), a 1969 Pakistan Navy submarine nicknamed "The Shark"
- Typhoon-class submarine, native name Akula (Russian Акула,'Shark')
- Ukrspecsystems Shark, a Ukrainian unmanned aerial vehicle

== People ==
- The Shark (nickname), a list of people
- Amy Shark (born 1986), Australian singer-songwriter
- Shark (musician), Americana singer-songwriter / score composer

== Places ==
- Shark, Kyrgyzstan, Osh Region
- Shark Lake, Goldfields-Esperance region, Western Australia
- Shark Peak, Antarctica
- Shark Valley, Miami-Dade County, Florida, U.S.

== Science and technology ==
- Shark (application), an Apple software development optimization tool
- Shark, a release of VP-Info database language
- Shark, an IBM Enterprise Storage Server
- Soft Hard Real-Time Kernel (S.Ha.R.K. or SHaRK), a component-based real-time kernel architecture
- ShapeWriter, formerly Shorthand-Aided Rapid Keyboarding (SHARK), a data input method
- SHARK, a block cipher in cryptography
- Shark, a World War II Enigma cipher
- Shark 3D, software

== Sports teams ==
=== American football ===
- Jacksonville Sharks, an indoor American football team
- Jacksonville Sharks (WFL), a former American football team

=== Association football (soccer) ===
- Sharks F.C., a Nigerian football team
- Orlando Sharks, an American indoor soccer team

=== Australian rules football ===
- East Fremantle Football Club, nicknamed the Sharks
- Southport Australian Football Club, nicknamed the Sharks

=== Basketball ===
- Blue Sharks, nickname of the Hungarian basketball team Hübner Nyíregyháza BS
- Shanghai Sharks, a Chinese basketball team
- Sheffield Sharks, an English basketball team

=== Ice hockey ===
- Los Angeles Sharks, an ice hockey team 1972–1974
- San Jose Sharks, an American ice hockey team
- Worcester Sharks, an American ice hockey team

=== Rugby league ===
- Cronulla-Sutherland Sharks, an Australian rugby league team
- Bucks County Sharks, an American rugby league team
- Hull F.C., an English rugby league team once known as Hull Sharks

=== Rugby union ===
- Sharks (rugby union), a South African rugby union team
- Sharks (Currie Cup), a South Africa rugby union team that participates in the Currie Cup tournament
- Darlington Mowden Park Sharks, an English women's rugby union club
- Sale Sharks, an English rugby union team

=== Other sports ===
- Aussie Sharks, nickname of Australia's national water polo team
- Nova Southeastern Sharks, university athletics teams

== Transportation ==
- Shark.Aero Shark, a Slovak ultra-light aircraft
- Fly-Fan Shark, a Slovak light aircraft
- Shark 24, a yacht
- BYD Shark, a pickup truck
- Shark, an American speedboat used by Circle Line Downtown
- Shark, a version of the Rotopress garbage truck

== Other uses ==
- Sharking, or debagging, pulling down someone's trousers, underwear, or top
- Shark (moth), Cucullia umbratica

== See also ==
- Card shark, a person who uses skill and/or deception to win at card games
- Loan shark, a person who offers loans at extremely high interest rates
- Paul & Shark, an Italian clothing brand
- Pool shark (disambiguation)
- SHARC (disambiguation)
- Shark fin (disambiguation)
- Sharkey (disambiguation)
- Shark! Shark!, a 1982 video game
- Sharking (disambiguation)
- Sharq (disambiguation)
