= SHARC =

SHARC may refer to:

- S.H.A.R.C., a fictional vehicle in the G.I. Joe universe
- Shute Park Aquatic & Recreation Center
- Submillimeter High Angular Resolution Camera of the Caltech Submillimeter Observatory
- Super Harvard Architecture Single-Chip Computer, a DSP made by Analog Devices
- Swedish Highly Advanced Research Configuration
- Surface Hopping including ARbitrary Couplings - acronym used for the SHARC molecular dynamics software
- SHARC, the Sunriver Homeowners Aquatic and Recreation Center in Sunriver, Oregon.
- SHARC: Submarine High-fidelity Active-monitoring of Renewable-energy Cables (National Oceanography Centre, Southampton, UK)

== See also ==
- Shark (disambiguation)
