= Dance terms =

Different styles of dance have their own terminology. The following articles contain information on dance terms:

- Glossary of ballet terms
- Glossary of belly dance terms
- Glossary of country dance terms
- Glossary of dance moves
- Glossary of partner dance terms
