= SHARC molecular dynamics software =

SHARC
- Initial release: 2014
- Stable release: 2.1 / 14 October 2019; 6 years ago.
- Written in: Fortran, Python
- Operating system: Linux, any other Unix variety
- Type: Molecular dynamics (simulation)
- License: GNU GPL
- Website: sharc-md.org

SHARC (Surface Hopping Including Arbitrary Couplings) is an ab initio molecular dynamics program suite primarily dedicated to study the excited-state dynamics of molecules. It is free for academic use, open source released under the GNU General Public License.

== History ==
The SHARC software suite was made publicly available in October 2014. It is developed by the SHARC development team in the group of Prof. Leticia González at the Institute of Theoretical Chemistry at the University of Vienna, Austria.

== Features ==
The SHARC molecular dynamics software can treat non-adiabatic couplings at conical intersections, intersystem crossing induced by spin-orbit coupling, and laser couplings on an equal footing. It has interfaces to the ab initio software packages MOLPRO, MOLCAS, ORCA (quantum chemistry program), Gaussian (software), TURBOMOLE, COLUMBUS (needs MOLCAS), BAGEL and to user-created LVC (linear vibronic coupling) models, to machine learning properties via the SchNarc approach, as well as to a tool for analytical potentials. Furthermore, it includes auxiliary Python scripts for setup, maintenance and analysis of ensembles of trajectories.

== Applications ==
The underlying methodology is based on Surface hopping, a semiclassical technique in computational chemistry. SHARC extends this method to treat spin-orbit couplings and laser interactions on an equal footing in addition to the originally included non-adiabatic effects. It has been applied to study strong laser interactions in the IBr molecule. Further applications, deal with photorelaxation in SO_{2}, cytosine, and uracil.
