= Glossary of belly dance terms =

List of definitions of terms and concepts in belly dance

The following are the special concepts and terminology of belly dance. As this dance has many forms and can be found in North Africa and the Middle East, a significant proportion of the terminology is in Arabic. Turkish or Turkish-loan words may also be encountered among belly dance terms.

== Assuit ==
Assuit, also known as Tulle-bi-telli, is a textile marrying cotton or linen mesh with small strips of metal, with its origins dating to Ancient Egypt. The name translates roughly as "net with metal". It is frequently worn in Raqs Baladi.

== Baladi ==
Baladi (Arabic: بلدي / ALA-LC: baladī; nisba-adjective meaning "native", "indigenous", "of the country", "rural", comparable to English "folk", with a lower-class connotation. It can be used in the pejorative meaning "hick/backwards". It can also refer to an Egyptian musical style, the folk style of Egyptian belly dance (Raqs Baladi). It is also sometimes spelled in English as 'beledi'.

== Chest Camel ==
The chest camel is a movement which is made by isolating the chest, pushing it forward, up, back and down in a rolling undulation. The name of the move is derived from the walk of a camel.

== Darbuka ==
The darbuka Arabic: دربوكة / ALA-LC: darbūkah) is a single head hourglass shaped drum used mostly in the Middle East, North Africa, and Eastern Europe to accompany belly dancers. The word tabla is used in Egypt. Some outside the Middle East use the term "doumbak".

== Egyptian Figure Eight ==
Egyptian Figure Eight refers to the movement of one hip in opposition to the other on a vertical plane. As one hip moves down, away from the body, up, and then the back to center; the other hip moves up, into the centre, down, and then away from the body. The 'Egyptian Figure Eight' is the exact reverse of 'Maya Hips'. Whereas 'Maya Hips' draws circles from the top, the 'Egyptian Figure Eight' begins at the bottom of the circle.

== Fellah ==
Fellah (n.) (Arabic: فلاح, fallāḥ) (plural Fellaheen or Fellahin, فلاحين, fallāḥīn) is a peasant, farmer or agricultural laborer in the Middle East and North Africa. The word derives from the Arabic word for ploughman or tiller.

== Ghawazi ==
The Ghawazi (also ghawazee) dancers of Egypt were first a group of female traveling dancers, sometimes referred to as "Egyptian Gypsies", but the term then included all forms of poor dancers, and mainly those who entertain the upper-class and the rich. The ghawazi style was sometimes included in the Egyptian raqs sharqi sketches during the first half of the 20th century, and in turn to the Western forms of belly dance. While the performative raqs sharqi in urban Egypt was heavily influenced by Western styles such as classical ballet or Latin American dance, the term ghawazi in Egypt refers to the dancers in rural Egypt who have preserved the traditional 18th to 19th century style. The Arabic غوازي ghawāzī (singular غازية ghāziya) means "conqueror", as the ghaziya is said to "conquer" the hearts of her audience.

== Ghawazee Step ==
Also referred to as the push step, the ghawazee step is characterized by the hands perpendicular to the floor, at waist height, pushing forward as the dancer steps; the back hip is pushed back in imitation of a horse.

== Hafla ==
Hafla, from the Arabic meaning get-together, party, or ceremony. Outside of Arabic-speaking countries it began to be used after 2000 to refer to a gathering of belly dancers, often with a formal stage show and vendors.

== Karsilama ==
Karsilamas (Greek: καρσιλαμάς, Turkish: karşılama), pronounced carshulamah, is a folk dance spread all over Northwest Asia Minor and carried to Greece by Asia Minor refugees. The term "karsilamas" comes from the Turkish word "karşılama" meaning "face to face greeting". The dance is still popular on Northwestern areas of Turkey, especially on wedding parties, festivals and so on. It can also refer to the 9/8 rhythm counted 2,2,2,3.

== Maya Hips ==
Maya Hips is the movement of one hip in opposition to the other on a vertical plane. As one hip moves up, away from the body, down, and then the back to center; the other hip moves down, into the center, up, and then away from the body. This move is the opposite of the Egyptian Figure Eight.

== Ouled Nail ==
The Ouled Naïl are a confederation of Amazigh tribes living in the Ouled Naïl Mountains of Algeria strongly influenced by the Arabs. The Ouled Naïl tribe also originated a style of music known as "Bou Saâda" music. In belly dancing, the term refers to a style of dance originated by the Ouled Naïl people. They are noted for their belly dancing.

== Raqs Baladi ==
The folk style of Egyptian belly dance. From the Arabic Raqs meaning dance and Baladi meaning rural. It is more stationary than raqs sharqi, with little use of the arms, and the focus is on hip movements. It is performed to baladi or folk music. Typical costuming for performances of this dance style is a long dress covering the midriff. The most common version has a straight skirt with side slits, long sleeves which may be slit to the elbows, and a scooped or shirt-style neckline. A sash may be worn around the hips, and a headscarf is often also worn. A baladi-style performance may include the use of sagat, or the dancer may perform with a cane (assaya).

== Raqs Sharqi ==
Raqs sharqi (Arabic: رقص شرقي), is the style of Egyptian belly dance that developed in the first half of the 20th century and is performed in cabarets and clubs and highly influenced by ballet, modern dance, and Latin dance. The term is derived from the Arabic raqs meaning dance and sharqi meaning of the east. The style is often considered the classical style of belly dance.

== Sa’idi ==
A Sa'idi (Arabic: صعيدى) is a generic term used in Egypt to refer to a person from Upper Egypt (Arabic: صعيد مصر Sa'id). The word literally means "from Sa'id" (i.e. Upper Egypt), and can also refer to a form of music originating there, their style of dance, or to the dialect spoken by Sa'idis. Sa’idi dance is a folkloric dance (one of the baladi dances) from the Sa'id. The dance style includes energetic bouncy footwork, steps imitating horses, and frequently incorporates a stick or cane, called an Assaya (Arabic for stick).

== Sa’idi Step ==
The Sa'idi step is similar to the Ghawazi step in that the hip is pushed backwards in imitation of a horse; however, in this step, one foot remains anchored while the other foot steps backwards and forwards. The arms echo the moving leg.

== Taqsim ==
Taqsim (Arabic: تَقْسِيم / ALA-LC: taqsīm; Greek: ταξίμι taksimi, Turkish: taksim) is a melodic musical improvisation that usually precedes the performance of a traditional Arabic, Greek, Middle Eastern, or Turkish musical composition. The taqsim may often be played to introduce the belly dancer; the dancer may stay backstage until the rhythm instruments begin.

== Tsifteteli ==
Tsifteteli (Greek: τσιφτετέλι, Turkish: Çiftetelli) is the Balkan and Anatolian form of belly dance, although it is primarily encountered in Greece. The word is Turkish for "double-stringed" due to the violin playing style that is present in this kind of music.

The characteristic rhythm is in 8/4 time, arranged as either 3/3/2 eighth-notes followed by 2/2/2/xx (the last beat being silent), or sometimes the first measure is played as 2/2/x1/1x. It is primarily performed by women.

== Turkish Figure Eight ==
The Turkish Figure Eight is the movement of the hips in opposition on a horizontal plane. As one hip moves forward, away from the body, back, and then the back to center; the other hip moves back, into the center, forward, and then away from the body.

== Uzun Hava ==
Uzun hava comes from the Turkish for long air. This refers to a vocal solo in Turkish music that has no rhythm or measure, and is often improvised. It is conceptually equivalent to the Arabic taqsim. It is generally associated with folk music of the southeast of Turkey. Generally, the singer improvises with long sorrowful notes in the middle of the song.

== Wahda wa noss ==
Arabic rhythm with two distinct parts meaning 'one and a half' used in Egyptian baladi dance.

== Zar ==
Zār or Zaar (Arabic/Persian: زار) is a religious custom. It apparently originated in central Ethiopia during the 18th century, later spreading throughout East and North Africa. Zār custom involves the possession of an individual (usually female) by a spirit.

It is also observed in Egypt, Sudan, Somalia, southern Iran, India and elsewhere in the Middle East.

== Zar Head ==
Zar Head refers to the belly dance move where the head is rotated in circles throwing the hair in imitation of the zar ritual.

== Zill ==
Zills, also sājāt (صاجات) in Arabic or finger cymbals, (from Turkish zil, "bell" or "cymbal") are tiny metallic cymbals used in belly dancing and similar performances.
