= Sharking =

Sharking may refer to:

- Card sharking or sharping, use of skill and/or deception to win at card games
- Pool sharking (which has multiple meanings)
- Loan sharking, lending money at extremely high interest rates
- Sharking or debagging, slang for the pulling down of someone's pants, underwear, top, or other clothing, usually against their will
- Sharking, pick-up artist slang (principally British) for determined and repeated attempts to seduce a potential sexual partner that has recently reached the age of consent
