= Todd Martínez =

American chemist

Todd J. Martínez
- Born: March 22, 1968 (age 58); New York City, U.S.
- Education: Calvin College; UCLA
- Known for: ab initio multiple spawning technique for excited states dynamics; Hijacking videogame hardware for quantum chemistry
- Awards: MacArthur Fellow (2005); Remsen Award (2021)
- Scientific career
- Fields: physical chemistry theoretical chemistry
- Workplaces: Stanford University; University of Illinois
- Thesis: Development and application of pseudospectral methods for the treatment of electron correlation (1994)
- Doctoral advisor: Emily A. Carter

Todd Joseph Martínez is a David Mulvane Ehrsam and Edward Curtis Franklin Professor of Chemistry at Stanford University and a Professor of Photon Science at the SLAC National Accelerator Laboratory.

== Education ==
He attended Carol Morgan School in the Dominican Republic before receiving his B.S. from Calvin College in 1989 and his Ph.D. from UCLA in 1994. He was a Fulbright Fellow at the Fritz Haber Institute for Molecular Dynamics at Hebrew University in Jerusalem, Israel and later a University of California Presidential Postdoctoral Fellow at UCLA.

== Career ==
After completing his postdoctoral fellowships, Martínez joined the faculty at the University of Illinois in 1996. He was named a Gutgsell Professor of Chemistry at the University of Illinois in 2006. He joined the Stanford faculty in 2009. Martínez was appointed a co-editor of the Annual Review of Physical Chemistry in 2012 and is credited in issues from 2014 to 2025.

Professor Martínez is a theoretical chemist whose research focuses primarily on developing first-principles approaches to chemical reaction dynamics, starting from the fundamental equations of quantum mechanics. He is particularly interested in electronically excited states and the response of molecules to light. Reactions of electronically excited molecules often involve conical intersections, around which the potential energy surfaces have the shape of intersecting cones. He developed a method known as ab initio multiple spawning, or AIMS, which predicts the dynamic evolution of systems having conical intersections. The computational methods Martínez developed while observing nonadiabatic chemical reactions attempts to predict the direction and shape molecules take on during the process. One scenario created by Dr. Martínez focuses on photoisomerization. He has created models for photoinduced isomerization in retinal, which represents the biophysical basis for vision. He has also shown how videogame hardware, especially graphical processing units (GPUs), can be used to accelerate quantum chemistry simulations.

Martínez's research has been supported by an NSF Career Award, a MacArthur Foundation Fellowship, a Packard Foundation Fellowship, a Sloan Foundation Fellowship, a Beckman Young Investigators Award, a Research Innovation Award, a Dreyfus Teacher-Scholar Award, and grants from the NSF, DOE, NIH, Research Corporation, and the Human Frontier Science Program (HFSP). He was elected to the American Academy of Arts & Sciences in 2011 and to the National Academy of Sciences in 2019. In 2021 Martinez received the Remsen Award.

Todd J. Martinez while born in New York spent a majority of his childhood in Central America and the Caribbean region.

== Representative publications ==
- Insights for Light-Driven Molecular Devices from Ab Initio Multiple Spawning Dynamics, T. J. Martínez, Acc. Chem. Res., 39, 119 (2006). doi:10.1021/ar040202q
- Competitive Decay at Two and Three-State Conical Intersections in Excited State Intramolecular Proton Transfer, J. D. Coe and T. J. Martínez, J. Am. Chem. Soc. 127, 4560 (2005). doi:10.1021/ja043093j
- Conical Intersection Dynamics in Solution: The Chromophore of Green Fluorescent Protein, A. Toniolo, S. Olsen, L. Manohar, and T. J. Martínez, Faraday Disc., 127, 149 (2004). doi:10.1039/b401167h
