= Heil Environmental Industries =

Vehicle manufacturing company

The Heil Co.
- Founded: 1901
- Founder: Julius P. Heil
- Headquarters: Chattanooga, Tennessee, United States
- Products: Garbage trucks
- Parent: Terex Corporation
- Website: http://www.heil.com/

Heil Environmental Industries, a subsidiary of Terex Corporation, is a manufacturer of garbage and recycling trucks. For many decades, Heil Environmental has been the chief supplier of refuse and recycling equipment for the New York City Sanitation Department., which is the world's largest waste collection agency. The company has many smaller municipal customers, national publicly traded customers, and regional/small haulers as well. Heil has an extensive US dealer network and also sells & supports its products in many countries around the world.

== History ==
The company, originally named the Heil Rail Joint Welding Co., was founded in 1901 by Julius P. Heil in Milwaukee, Wisconsin. The early company specialized in using the then-new technology of electrical welding to manufacture street car rails, tanks, and truck bodies.

Heil is currently based in Chattanooga, Tennessee, with its flagship manufacturing facility located in Fort Payne, Alabama.

The original Heil manufacturing complex at 3031 W. Montana St. in Milwaukee has been renovated and is primarily used as the Corporate Campus of Aurora Health Care, Inc.

== Products ==
- Front Loaders
  - Half/Pack
  - Half/Pack LowRider
  - Half/Pack Freedom
  - Half/Pack Sierra
  - Half/Pack Odyssey
- Side Loaders
  - Durapack Python
  - Durapack Rapid Rail
  - Rapid Rail
  - Liberty
  - RevAMP Electric
- Rear Loaders
  - PT1100
  - Durapack 5000
  - PowerTrak Commercial
  - Durapack 4060 Split Body
  - PT1000
