= Sharkey (disambiguation) =

Sharkey is a surname of Irish origin.

Sharkey, Sharky, Sharkie or Sharkies may also refer to:

== Places ==
- Sharkey, Kentucky, United States, an unincorporated community
- Sharkey County, Mississippi, United States

== People ==
=== Nickname ===
- Sharkey Bonano (1904–1972), American jazz trumpeter, band leader and vocalist
- Lewis Brown (rugby league) (born 1986), New Zealand rugby league footballer nicknamed "Sharky"
- Sharkey McEwen, California-born musician and producer
- Mark Robinson (rugby union, born 1975), New Zealand retired rugby union footballer nicknamed "Sharky"
- George Sweatt (1893–1983), American Negro league baseball player nicknamed "Sharky"
- Sharkey Ward (born 1943), Royal Navy officer

=== Surname ===
- Bill Sharky, former member of The Barron Knights, a British humorous pop group
- Feargal Sharkey, singer from Northern Ireland, former lead singer of The Undertones
- Kevin Sharkey, artist, former actor, TV presenter and presidential candidate
- Rebekha Sharkie (born 1972), Australian politician

=== Stage name ===
- DJ Sharkey (born 1975), British DJ born Jonathan Kneath
- Sharky (internet personality) (born 1995), Dutch-British internet personality
- Sharky, former member of the Prodigy, an English electronic dance music group
- Sharky P or Sharkie P, a UK garage MC and member of DJ Pied Piper and the Masters of Ceremonies

== Fictional characters ==
- An alias for Saruman, in J. R. R. Tolkien's The Lord of the Rings
- C. P. O. Otto Sharkey, main character of eponymous sitcom starring Don Rickles
- James "Sharky" Harkin, main character of the 2006 play The Seafarer by Irish playwright Conor McPherson
- Sharky, a puppet in Sharky's Friends, an Australian children's television game show
- one of the title characters of Sharky & George, a French and Canadian animated children's television series
- Sharky the Sharkdog, a character in Eek! The Cat, an American-Canadian animated series
- Sharkey, right-hand man of Olrik in Blake and Mortimer, Franco-Belgian comics series
- Sharky, mascot of the Sea Life Minnesota Aquarium
- Sharkie, mascot of the Sharks (rugby union)
- Sharkey, one of the protagonists in the James Bond film Licence to Kill
- Lawyer Sharky, a Disney character from the Donald Duck universe
- S.J. Sharkie, the mascot for the San Jose Sharks

== Other uses ==
- USS Sharkey (DD-281), a destroyer in service between the world wars
- Cronulla-Sutherland Sharks, Australian professional rugby league team nicknamed the "Sharkies"
- Sharkey (software), microblogging software

== See also ==
- Shark (disambiguation)
