= Ab initio multiple spawning =

Method in quantum chemistry

The ab initio multiple spawning, or AIMS, method is a time-dependent formulation of quantum chemistry.

In AIMS, nuclear dynamics and electronic structure problems are solved simultaneously. Quantum mechanical effects in the nuclear dynamics are included, especially the nonadiabatic effects which are crucial in modeling dynamics on multiple electronic states.

The AIMS method makes it possible to describe photochemistry from first principles molecular dynamics, with no empirical parameters. The method has been applied to two molecules of interest in organic photochemistry - ethylene and cyclobutene.

The photodynamics of ethylene involves both covalent and ionic electronic excited states and the return to the ground state proceeds through a pyramidalized geometry. For the photoinduced ring opening of cyclobutene, is it shown that the disrotatory motion predicted by the Woodward–Hoffmann rules is established within the first 50 fs after optical excitation.

The method was developed by chemistry professor Todd Martinez.
