= Photorelaxation =

Relaxation of blood vessels in response to light

Photorelaxation or photo-vasorelaxation, is described as the relaxation of blood vessels in response to light. This has been reported for around sixty years, it was never described, pursued or explained. It was serendipitously rediscovered by Dr. Gautam Sikka and his mentor Dr. Dan Berkowitz at Johns Hopkins University in Baltimore, USA, and along with his team he not only elucidated the mechanism but is trying to harness light for treatment of cardiovascular disease. The research by Sikka et al concluded that there light-sensing receptors, melanopsin receptors, are present in blood vessels and mediate wavelength specific, light-dependent vascular relaxation. This photorelaxation signal transduction involves cyclic guanosine monophosphate (cGMP) and phosphodiesterase type 6, but not cGMP-dependent protein kinase or Protein Kinase G (PKG). Furthermore, it is regulated by Beta adrenergic receptor kinase type 1 (βARK or BARK) also called G protein coupled receptor kinase 2 (GRK2), and involves vascular hyperpolarization, and this receptor pathway could be targeted for wavelength-specific light-based therapy in the treatment of diseases that involve altered vasoreactivity.
