= Pool shark =

Pool shark or pool sharks may refer to:

- Pool shark, to distract, or hustle, in pool

== Film and television ==
- Pool Sharks, or sometimes The Pool Shark, a 1915 silent film
- "Pool Shark", an episode of Drake & Josh TV show, 2004

== Music ==
- The Pool Shark, an album by Dave Dudley, 1970
  - "The Pool Shark" (song), a song written by Tom T. Hall, recorded by Dave Dudley
- "Pool Shark", a 1987 song by The Toasters from their album Skaboom
- "Pool Shark", a 1994 song by Sublime, from their album Robbin' the Hood
- "Pool Shark", a 2009 song by The Cherry Poppin' Daddies, from their album Skaboy JFK

== Other uses ==
- Pool Shark (video game), also known as Actua Pool, 1999
  - Pool Shark 2, a sequel
- Pool Shark (1977 Video Game) an Atari, Inc. video arcade game

== See also ==
- Pool (disambiguation)
- Shark (disambiguation)
