= Sharq =

Sharq or Sharqi, from Arabic and Persian 'East', may refer to:

== Places ==
- Sharq, Iran
- Sharqi, Iran
- Sharqi Rural District, Iran
- Sharq, Kuwait

== Other uses ==
- Shargh, an Iranian reformist daily newspaper
- Sharq (TV channel), Afghanistan
- Sharq (magazine), a 1924–1932 Persian literary magazine
- Sharq, a subsidiary company of SABIC
- Sharq COD, a Saudi football team
- Sharqi dynasty, rulers of the Jaunpur Sultanate
- Sharqi (wind), a seasonal wind in the Middle East

== See also ==
- Ash Sharqiyah (disambiguation)
- East (disambiguation)
- Shark (disambiguation)
- Mashriq, the historical region of the Arab world to the east of Egypt
