= The Shark (nickname) =

The Shark is the nickname of the following people:

- Roger Bernadina (born 1984), Major League Baseball player from Curaçao
- Humberto Brenes (born 1951), Costa Rican professional poker player
- Brydon Coverdale, Australian television personality
- Kenneth Gant (born 1967), American former National Football League player
- Greg Norman (born 1955), Australian professional golfer
- Jeff Samardzija (born 1985), Major League Baseball pitcher
- Mark Shrader (born 1967), American former professional wrestler
- Mark Shelton, heavy metal guitarist and founder of the band Manilla Road
- Michele Sindona (1920–1986), an Italian banker
- John Tenta (1963–2006), a Canadian professional wrestler and sumōtori
- Mark Titus (born 1987), American blogger and former college basketball player

== See also ==
- Jerry Tarkanian (born 1930), American retired college basketball head coach known as "Tark the Shark"
- Mark Selby (born 1983), English professional snooker and pool player known as "Mark the Shark"
