= Multi-configuration time-dependent Hartree =

Quantum chemistry algorithm

Multi-configuration time-dependent Hartree (MCTDH) is an approach to quantum molecular dynamics, an algorithm to solve the time-dependent Schrödinger equation for multidimensional dynamical systems consisting of distinguishable particles. The nuclei of molecules is one example of such particles and their vibrational motion is a form of time-dependence. The method uses an overall wavefunction composed of products of single-particle wavefunctions as first proposed by Douglas Hartree in 1927. The "multiconfiguration" part of the method refers to combining multiple such products.

MCTDH can predict the motion of the nuclei of a molecular system evolving on one or several coupled electronic potential energy surfaces. It is an approximate method whose numerical efficiency decreases with growing accuracy.

MCTDH is suited for multi-dimensional problems, in particular for problems that are difficult or even impossible to solve in conventional ways.

== Methods ==
=== Basic algorithm ===
==== Wavefunction expansion ====
$\Psi(q_i,...,q_f,t) = \sum_{j_1}^{n_1} ... \sum_{j_f}^{n_f} A_{j_1 ... j_f}(t)\prod_{\kappa=1}^{f}\varphi^{(\kappa)}_{j_{\kappa}}(q_{\kappa},t)$

Where the number of configurations is given by the product $n_1 ... n_f$. The single particle functions (SPFs), $\varphi^{(\kappa)}_{j_{\kappa}}(q_{\kappa},t)$, are expressed in a time-independent basis set:

$\varphi^{(\kappa)}_{j_{\kappa}}(q_{\kappa},t) = \sum_{i_1 = 1}^{N_\kappa}c_{i_\kappa}^{(\kappa, j_\kappa)}(t) \; \chi_{i_\kappa}^{(\kappa)}(q_\kappa)$

Where $\chi_{i_\kappa}^{(\kappa)}(q_\kappa)$ is a primitive basis function, in general a Discrete Variable Representation (DVR) that is dependent on coordinate $q_\kappa$. If $n_1 ... n_f = 1$, one returns to the Time Dependent Hartree (TDH) approach. In MCTDH, both the coefficients and the basis function are time-dependent and optimized using the variational principle.

==== Equations of motion ====
===== Lagrangian Variational Principle =====
$L = \langle\Psi | i \frac{\partial}{\partial t} - H | \Psi \rangle$

Where:

$\delta \int_{t_1}^{t_2} L \text{d}t = 0$

Which is subject to the boundary conditions $\delta L (t_1) = \delta L (t_2) = 0$. After integration, one obtains:

$\text{Re} \langle \delta \Psi | i \frac{\partial}{\partial t} - H | \Psi \rangle = 0$

===== McLachlan Variational Principle =====
$\delta || i \frac{\partial}{\partial t} - H \Psi ||^2 = 0$

Where only the time derivative is to be varied. We can rewrite this norm squared term as a scalar product, and vary the bra and ket side of the product:

$$\begin{align}
0 &= \delta\langle i \frac{\partial}{\partial t} \Psi - H \Psi |i \frac{\partial}{\partial t}\Psi - H | \Psi \rangle \\
&= \langle i \delta \frac{\partial}{\partial t} \Psi | i \frac{\partial}{\partial t} - H | \Psi \rangle + \langle (i\frac{\partial}{\partial t} - H)\Psi | i\delta \frac{\partial}{\partial t}\Psi \rangle\\
&= -i \langle \delta \Psi | i \frac{\partial}{\partial t} - H | \Psi \rangle + i\langle (i\frac{\partial}{\partial t} - H)\Psi | \delta \Psi \rangle \\
&= 2 \text{Im} \langle \delta \Psi | i \frac{\partial}{\partial t} - H | \Psi \rangle
\end{align}$$

===== Dirac-Frenkel Variational Principle =====
If each variation of $\delta \Psi, i\delta\Psi$ is an allowed variation, then both the Lagrangian and the McLanchlan Variational Principle turn into the Dirac-Frenkel Variational Principle:

$\langle \delta \Psi | i \frac{\partial}{\partial t} - H | \Psi \rangle = 0$

Which simplest and thus preferred method of deriving the equations of motion.

=== Multi-layer extension ===
==== Motivation ====
The original ansatz of MCTDH generates a single layer tensor tree; however, there is a limit to the size and complexity this single layer can handle. This prompted the development of a multilayer (ML)-MCTDH ansatz by Wang and Thoss, which was generalized by Manthe implemented in the Heidelberg package by Vendrell and Meyer.

==== Tensor Tree Formalism ====
Multiple layers are generated through the creation of a tensor tree of nodes linking the modes (DOFs). Solving the tree layout is an NP-hard problem, but strides have been taken to automate this process through mode correlations by Mendive-Tapia.

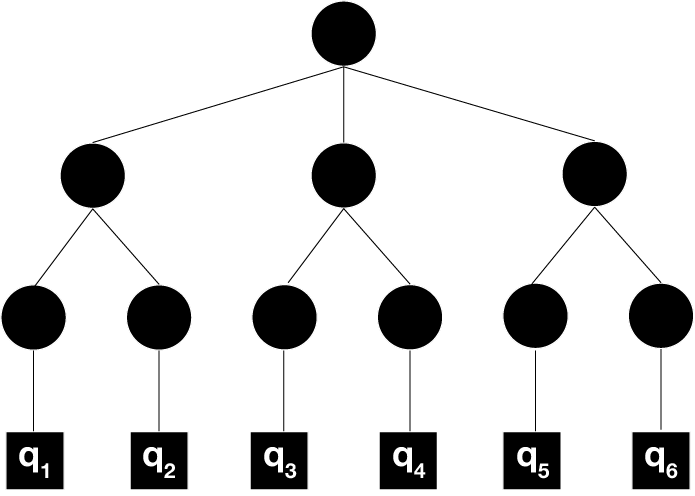
Example MCTDH tree with l representing layers and q1-6 being the modes.

==== Wave function expansion ====
The generalized ML expansion of Meyer can be written as follows:

$$\begin{align}
\varphi^{z-1,\kappa_{l-1}}_{m}(q^{z-1}_{\kappa_{l-1}}) &= \sum^{n_1^z}_{j_1 = 1} ... \sum^{n_{p^z}^z}_{j_{p^z} = 1} A^z_{m;j_1, ..., j_{p^z}} \prod^{p^z}_{\kappa_l = 1}\varphi^{z,\kappa_l}_{j_{\kappa_l}} (q^z_{\kappa_l}) \\
&= \sum_{J}A^z_{m;J}\cdot \Phi^z_J (q^{z-1}_{\kappa_{l-1}})
\end{align}$$

Where the coordinates are combined as

$q^{z-1}_{\kappa_{l-1}}= (q^z_1, ..., q^z_{p^z})$

==== Equations of motion ====
Where the equations of motion are now represented as follows:

$$\begin{align}
i\frac{\partial A^1_J}{\partial t} &= \sum_K \langle \Phi^1_J | \hat{H} - \sum^{p^1}_{\kappa_1 = 1} \hat{g}^{1,\kappa_1}| \Phi^1_K \rangle A^1_K\\
&= \sum_K \langle \Phi^1_J | \hat{H} | \Phi^1_K \rangle A^1_K - \sum^{p^1}_{\kappa_1 = 1}\sum_{i=1}^{n^1_{\kappa_1}}\hat{g}^{1,\kappa_1}_{j_{\kappa_1}i}A_{j_1 ... i ... j_{p^1}}
\end{align}$$

The SPF EOMs are formally defined the same for all layers:

$i\frac{\partial \varphi^{z,\kappa_l}_n}{\partial t} = (1 - P^{z,\kappa_l})\sum^{n^z_{\kappa_l}}_{j,m = 1} (p^{z,\kappa_l})^{-1}_{nj}\cdot \langle\hat{H}\rangle^{z, \kappa_l}_{jm}\varphi^{z, \kappa_l}_m + \sum^{n^z_{\kappa_l}}_{j=1}{g^{z, \kappa_l}_{jn} \varphi^{z,\kappa_l}_j}$

Where $\hat{g}$ is a Hermitian gauge operator defined as follows:

$\langle \varphi^{z,\kappa_l}_{j}| i\frac{\partial}{\partial t}\varphi^{z, \kappa_l}_k \rangle = \langle \varphi^{z,\kappa_l}_{j} | \hat{g}^{z, \kappa_l} | \varphi^{z,\kappa_l}_{k} \rangle = g^{z, \kappa_l}_{jk}$

== Examples of uses in literature ==
=== NOCl ===
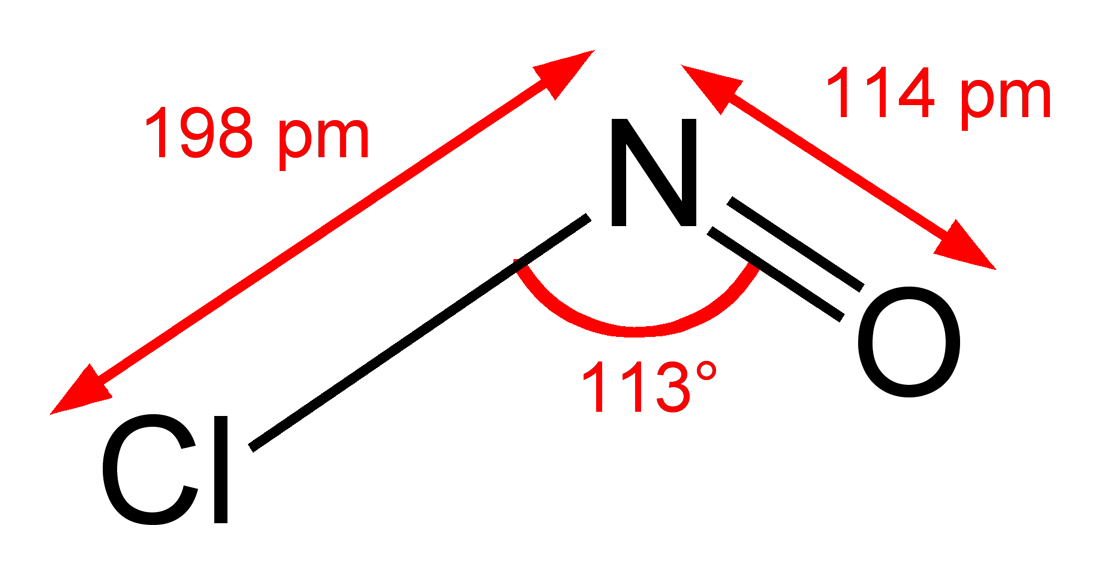

The first verification of the MCTDH method was with the NOCl molecule. Its size and asymmetry makes it a perfect test bed for MCTDH: it is small and simple enough for its numerics to be manually verified, yet complicated enough for it to already squeeze advantages against conventional product-basis methods.

=== Water clusters ===
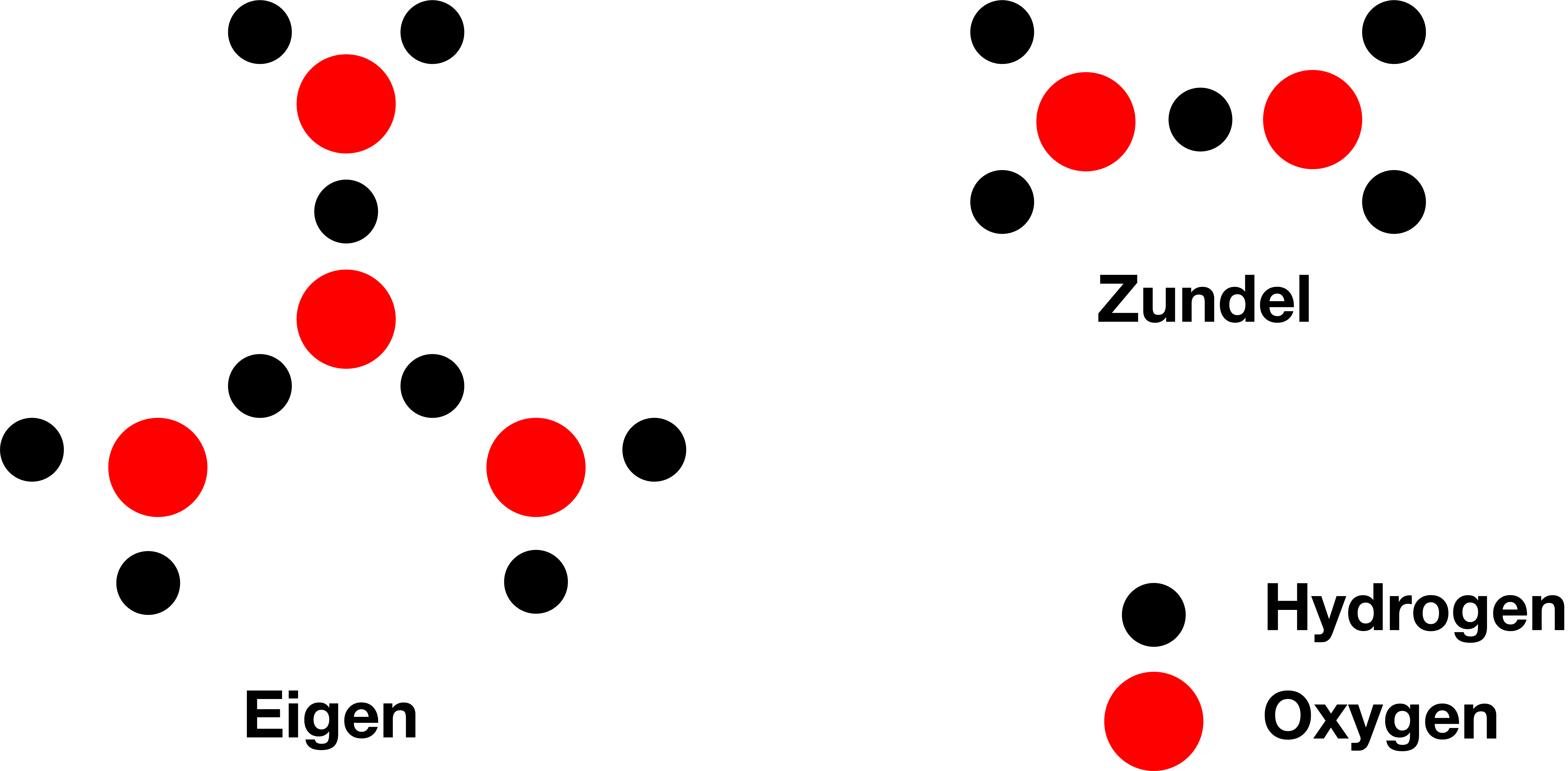

The solvation of the hydronium ion is a topic of continued research. Researchers have been able to successfully use MCTDH to model the Zundel and Eigen ions in close agreement with experiment.

== Limitations ==
Approximate Degree of Freedom Allowance for Each Computational Method
Method	Degrees of Freedom Possible
Conventional Methods (e.g. TDH)	6
MCTDH	12
ML-MCTDH	24+
ML-MCTDH with the Spin-Boson Model	1000+

For a typical input in ML-MCTDH to be run, a node tree, potential energy surface, and equations of motion must be generated by the user. These prerequisites—along with total compute time—soft-cap the size of systems able to be studied with ML-MCTDH; however, advances in neural networks have been shown to address the difficulty of the generation of potential energy surfaces. These issues can also by circumvented by using the spin-boson or other similar bath models that do not pose the same assignment challenges.

== Software packages implementing the MCTDH method ==
Package Name	Group	University	Link
Heidelberg MCTDH	TC Group	Heidelberg University	Link
QUANTICS	Worth	UCL	Link
MCTDH-X	N/A	ETH Zurich	Link

=== Example Usage of the Heidelberg Package for NOCl ===
==== Input and Operator File ====
nocl0.inp

RUN-SECTION
relaxation
tfinal= 50.0
tout=   10.0
name = nocl0
overwrite
output    psi=double  timing
end-run-section

OPERATOR-SECTION
opname = nocl0
end-operator-section

SBASIS-SECTION
rd     =   5
rv     =   5
theta  =   5
end-sbasis-section

pbasis-section
#Label    DVR      N         Parameter
rd    sin     36   3.800    5.600
rv    HO      24   2.136    0.272,ev  13615.5
theta Leg     60     0      0
end-pbasis-section

INTEGRATOR-SECTION
CMF/var =  0.50 , 1.0d-5
BS/spf =   10 , 1.0d-7
SIL/A  =   12 , 1.0d-7
end-integrator-section

INIT_WF-SECTION
build
rd    gauss  4.315  0.0   0.0794
rv    HO     2.151  0.0    0.218,eV    13615.5
theta gauss  2.22   0.0   0.0745
end-build
end-init_wf-section

ALLOC-SECTION
maxkoe=160
maxhtm=220
maxhop=220
maxsub=60
maxLMR=1
maxdef=85
maxedim=1
maxfac=25
maxmuld=1
maxnhtmshift=1
end-alloc-section

end-input

nocl0.op

OP_DEFINE-SECTION
title
NOCl S0 surface
end-title
end-op_define-section

PARAMETER-SECTION
mass_rd = 16.1538, AMU
mass_rv =  7.4667, AMU
end-parameter-section

HAMILTONIAN-SECTION
---------------------------------------------------------
modes         |  rd           |  rv           | theta
---------------------------------------------------------
0.5/mass_rd   |  q^-2         |  1            | j^2
0.5/mass_rv   |  1            | q^-2          | j^2
1.0           |  KE           |  1            |  1
1.0           |  1            |  KE           |  1
1.0           |1&2&3  V
---------------------------------------------------------
end-hamiltonian-section

LABELS-SECTION
V = srffile {nocl0um, default}
end-labels-section

end-operator

==== Output absorption spectrum ====
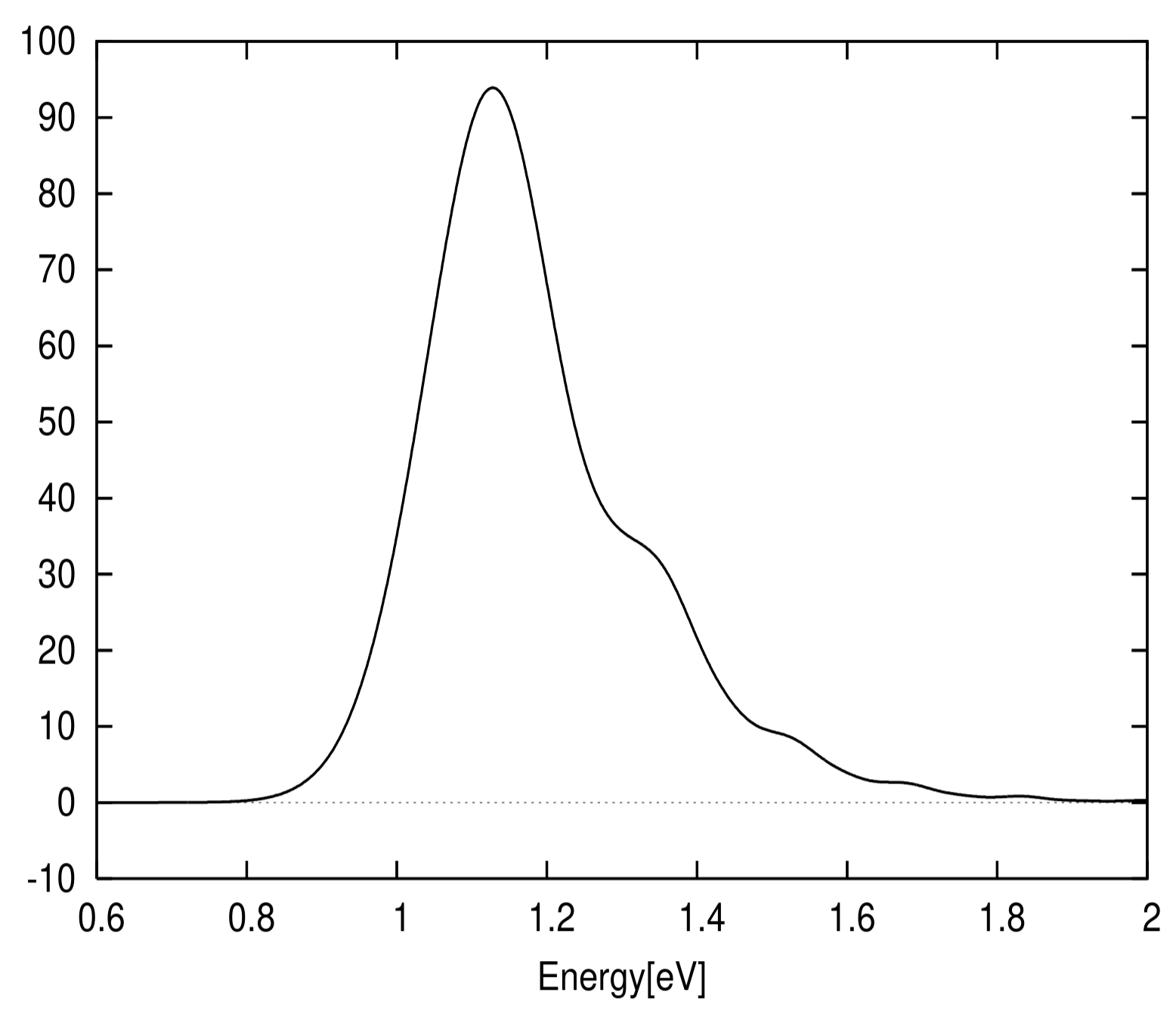
The absorption spectrum for the NOCl molecule on excitation to the S1 state
