= Shark fin =

Shark fin or Shark Fin may refer to:

- The fins of a shark
  - Shark fin soup, a soup made with shark fins
  - Shark fin medicinals as quackery
- Shark Fin, a peak in Antarctica
  - Shark Fin Glacier, a glacier near the Antarctic peak

== See also ==
- Shark finning
