= Saab SHARC =

Experimental UAV

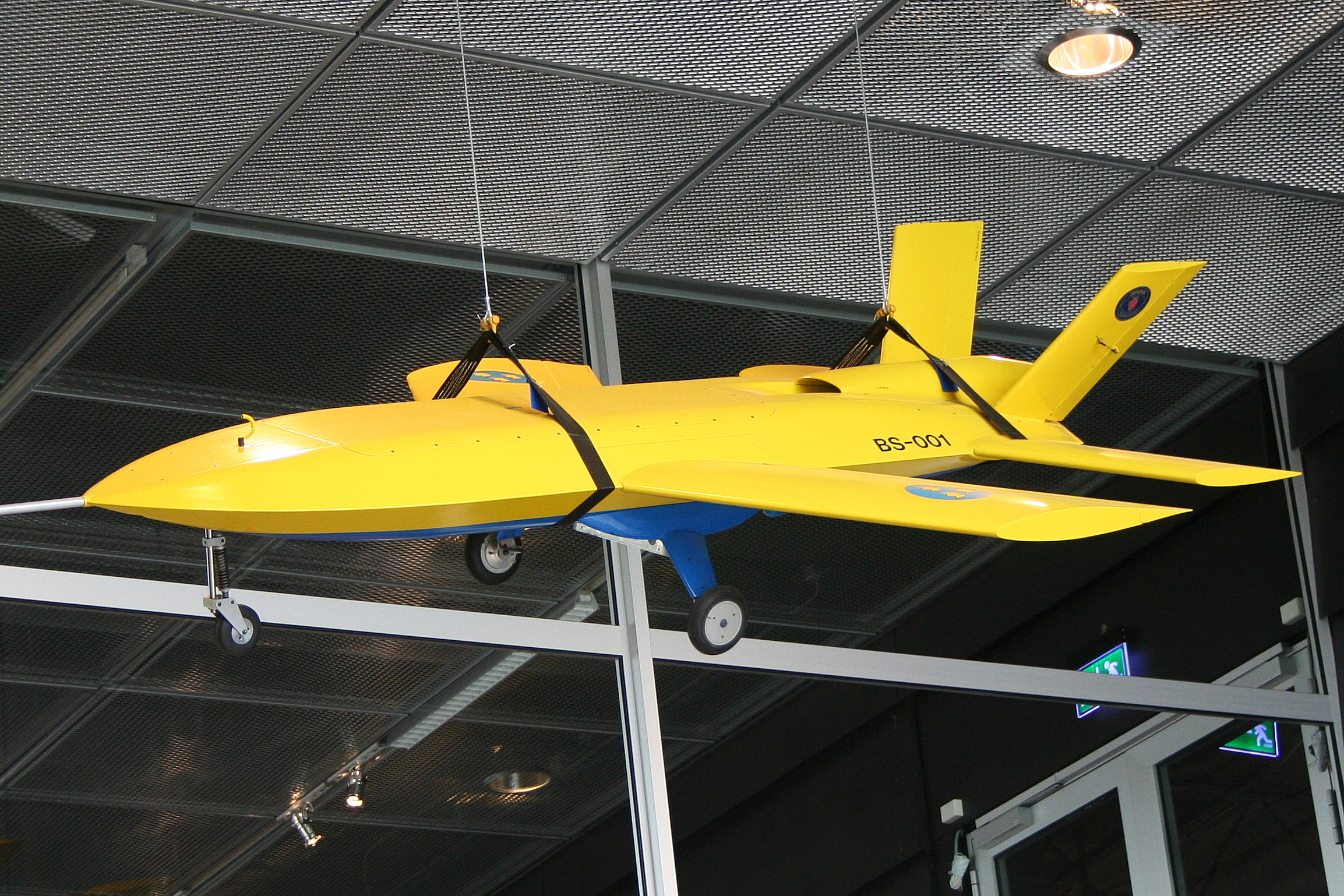
Model of a SHARC.

Swedish Highly Advanced Research Configuration (SHARC) is an experimental stealth unmanned aerial vehicle (UAV) built by Saab AB. Saab also plays a role in the creation of UAVs such as the stealth UAV Filur and stealth UCAV Dassault nEUROn. The main objectives of the SHARC project were to develop a high level of autonomy within an early unmanned aircraft and the capability of using a small and quick development process and the airworthiness process involving the FLYGI of the Swedish Armed Forces.
