= Surface hopping =

Molecular dynamics simulation technique

Surface hopping is a mixed quantum-classical technique that incorporates quantum mechanical effects into molecular dynamics simulations. Traditional molecular dynamics assume the Born-Oppenheimer approximation, where the lighter electrons adjust instantaneously to the motion of the nuclei. Though the Born-Oppenheimer approximation is applicable to a wide range of problems, there are several applications, such as photoexcited dynamics, electron transfer, and surface chemistry where this approximation falls apart. Surface hopping partially incorporates the non-adiabatic effects by including excited adiabatic surfaces in the calculations, and allowing for 'hops' between these surfaces, subject to certain criteria.

== Motivation ==
Molecular dynamics simulations numerically solve the classical equations of motion. These simulations, though, assume that the forces on the electrons are derived solely by the ground adiabatic surface. Solving the time-dependent Schrödinger equation numerically incorporates all these effects, but is computationally unfeasible when the system has many degrees of freedom. To tackle this issue, one approach is the mean field or Ehrenfest method, where the molecular dynamics is run on the average potential energy surface given by a linear combination of the adiabatic states. This was applied successfully for some applications, but has some important limitations. When the difference between the adiabatic states is large, then the dynamics must be primarily driven by only one surface, and not an average potential. In addition, this method also violates the principle of microscopic reversibility.

Surface hopping accounts for these limitations by propagating an ensemble of trajectories, each one of them on a single adiabatic surface at any given time. The trajectories are allowed to 'hop' between various adiabatic states at certain times such that the quantum amplitudes for the adiabatic states follow the time dependent Schrödinger equation. The probability of these hops are dependent on the coupling between the states, and is generally significant only in the regions where the difference between adiabatic energies is small.

== Theory behind the method ==
The formulation described here is in the adiabatic representation for simplicity. It can easily be generalized to a different representation. The coordinates of the system are divided into two categories: quantum ($\mathbf{q}$) and classical ($\mathbf{R}$). The Hamiltonian of the quantum degrees of freedom with mass $m_n$ is defined as:

$$H = \sum_n -\frac{\hbar^2}{2m_n}\nabla_{q_n}^2 + V(\mathbf{q},\mathbf{R})$$,

where $V$ describes the potential for the whole system. The eigenvalues of $H$ as a function of $\mathbf{R}$ are called the adiabatic surfaces :$\phi_n(\mathbf{q};\mathbf{R})$. Typically, $\mathbf{q}$ corresponds to the electronic degree of freedom, light atoms such as hydrogen, or high frequency vibrations such as O-H stretch. The forces in the molecular dynamics simulations are derived only from one adiabatic surface, and are given by:

$$\begin{align}
\mathbf{F}_{\mathbf{R}} &= -\nabla_{\mathbf{R}}\langle\phi_n|H|\phi_n\rangle \\
&= -\langle\phi_n|\nabla_{R}H|\phi_n\rangle,
\end{align}$$

where $n$ represents the chosen adiabatic surface. The last equation is derived using the Hellmann-Feynman theorem. The brackets show that the integral is done only over the quantum degrees of freedom. Choosing only one adiabatic surface is an excellent approximation if the difference between the adiabatic surfaces is large for energetically accessible regions of $\mathbf{R}$. When this is not the case, the effect of the other states become important. This effect is incorporated in the surface hopping algorithm by considering the wavefunction of the quantum degrees of freedom at time t as an expansion in the adiabatic basis:

$$\psi(\mathbf{q};\mathbf{R},t)=\sum_n c_n(t)\phi_n(\mathbf{q};\mathbf{R})$$,

where $c_n(t)$ are the expansion coefficients. Substituting the above equation into the time dependent Schrödinger equation gives

$$i\hbar\dot{c_j}=\sum_n c_n\left(V_{jn}-i\hbar\dot{\mathbf{R}}.\mathbf{d}_{jn} \right)$$,

where $V_{jn}$ and the nonadiabatic coupling vector $\mathbf{d}_{jn}$ are given by

$$\begin{align}
V_{jn}&=\langle\phi_j|H|\phi_n\rangle=\langle\phi_j|H|\phi_j\rangle \delta_{jn}\\
\mathbf{d}_{jn}&=\langle\phi_j|\nabla_{\mathbf{R}}\phi_n\rangle
\end{align}$$

The adiabatic surface can switch at any given time t based on how the quantum probabilities $|c_j(t)|^2$ are changing with time. The rate of change of $|c_j(t)|^2$ is given by:

$$\dot{|c_j(t)|^2} = \sum_n \frac{2}{\hbar} Im(a_{nj}V_{jn}) - 2Re(a_{nj}\dot{\mathbf{R}}.\mathbf{d}_{jn})$$,

where $a_{nj}=c_nc_j^*$. For a small time interval dt, the fractional change in $|c_j(t)|^2$ is given by

$$\frac{|c_j(t+dt)|^2-|c_j(t)|^2}{|c_j(t)|^2} \approx \frac{dt}{a_{jj}} \sum_n \frac{2}{\hbar} Im(a_{nj}V_{jn}) - 2Re(a_{nj}\dot{\mathbf{R}}.\mathbf{d}_{jn})$$.

This gives the net change in flux of population from state $j$. Based on this, the probability of hopping from state j to n is proposed to be

$$P_{j\to n} = \frac{dt}{a_{jj}} \left(\frac{2}{\hbar} Im(a_{nj}V_{jn}) - 2Re(a_{nj}\dot{\mathbf{R}}.\mathbf{d}_{jn}) \right)$$.

This criterion is known as the "fewest switching" algorithm, as it minimizes the number of hops required to maintain the population in various adiabatic states.

Whenever a hop takes place, the velocity is adjusted to maintain conservation of energy. To compute the direction of the change in velocity, the nuclear forces in the transition is

$$\begin{align}
\langle\phi_j|\nabla_{\mathbf{R}}H|\phi_n\rangle &= \nabla_{\mathbf{R}}\langle\phi_j|H|\phi_n\rangle - \langle\nabla_{\mathbf{R}}\phi_j|H|\phi_n\rangle - \langle\phi_j|H|\nabla_{\mathbf{R}}\phi_n\rangle\\
&= \nabla_{\mathbf{R}} E_j \delta_{jn} + (E_j-E_n)\mathbf{d}_{jn},
\end{align}$$

where $E_j=\langle\phi_j|H|\phi_j\rangle$ is the eigen value. For the last equality, $d_{jn}=-d_{nj}$ is used. This shows that the nuclear forces acting during the hop are in the direction of the nonadiabatic coupling vector $\mathbf{d}_{jn}$. Hence $\mathbf{d}_{jn}$ is a reasonable choice for the direction along which velocity should be changed.

=== Frustrated hops ===
If the velocity reduction required to conserve energy while making a hop is greater than the component of the velocity to be adjusted, then the hop is known as frustrated. In other words, a hop is frustrated if the system does not have enough energy to make the hop. Several approaches have been suggested to deal with these frustrated hops. The simplest of these is to ignore these hops. Another suggestion is not to change the adiabatic state, but reverse the direction of the component of the velocity along the nonadiabatic coupling vector. Yet another approach is to allow the hop to happen if an allowed hopping point is reachable within uncertainty time $\delta t=\hbar/2\Delta E$, where $\Delta E$ is the extra energy that the system needed to make the hop possible. Ignoring forbidden hops without any form of velocity reversal does not recover the correct scaling for Marcus theory in the nonadiabatic limit, but a velocity reversal can usually correct the errors

=== Decoherence time ===
Surface hopping can develop nonphysical coherences between the quantum coefficients over large time which can degrade the quality of the calculations, at times leading the incorrect scaling for Marcus theory. To eliminate these errors, the quantum coefficients for the inactive state can be damped or set to zero after a predefined time has elapsed after the trajectory crosses the region where hopping has high probabilities.

== Outline of the algorithm ==
The state of the system at any time $t$ is given by the phase space of all the classical particles, the quantum amplitudes, and the adiabatic state. The simulation broadly consists of the following steps:

Step 1. Initialize the state of the system. The classical positions and velocities are chosen based on the ensemble required.

Step 2. Compute forces using Hellmann-Feynman theorem, and integrate the equations of motion by time step $\Delta t$ to obtain the classical phase space at time $t+\Delta t$.

Step 3. Integrate the Schrödinger equation to evolve quantum amplitudes from time $t$ to $t+\Delta t$ in increments of $\delta t$. This time step $\delta t$ is typically much smaller than $\Delta t$.

Step 4. Compute probability of hopping from current state to all other states. Generate a random number, and determine whether a switch should take place. If a switch does occur, change velocities to conserve energy. Go back to step 2, till trajectories have been evolved for the desired time.

== Applications ==
The method has been applied successfully to understand dynamics of systems that include tunneling, conical intersections and electronic excitation.

== Limitations and foundations ==
In practice, surface hopping is computationally feasible only for a limited number of quantum degrees of freedom. In addition, the trajectories must have enough energy to be able to reach the regions where probability of hopping is large.

Most of the formal critique of the surface hopping method comes from the unnatural separation of classical and quantum degrees of freedom. Recent work has shown, however, that the surface hopping algorithm can be partially justified by comparison with the Quantum Classical Liouville Equation. It has further been demonstrated that spectroscopic observables can be calculated in close agreement with the formally exact hierarchical equations of motion.

== See also ==
- Computational chemistry
- Molecular dynamics
- Path integral molecular dynamics
- Quantum chemistry
