= List of things named after Edward Teller =

Edward Teller (1908–2003) was a Hungarian-American theoretical physicist, regarded by some as "the father of the hydrogen bomb".

== Physics ==
- Ashkin–Teller model
- Axilrod–Teller potential
- Brunauer–Emmett–Teller theory
- Gamow–Teller transition
  - Gamow–Teller decay
- Hoffmann–Teller frame
- Inglis–Teller equation
- Jahn–Teller effect
  - Pseudo Jahn–Teller effect
- Lyddane–Sachs–Teller relation
- Pöschl–Teller potential
- Renner–Teller effects
- Teller–Ulam design

== Other ==
- Edward Teller Award
- 5006 Teller, planet
