= Hexaphosphabenzene =

- Depiction of the all-phosphorus analogue of benzene

Names
- IUPAC name hexaphosphinine

Identifiers
CAS Number	15924-07-9
3D model (JSmol)	Interactive image
ChemSpider	26667764
PubChem CID	15301818
CompTox Dashboard (EPA)	DTXSID80571147
- InChI: InChI=1S/P6/c1-2-4-6-5-3-1 Key: LUXLNUKEFPPPIN-UHFFFAOYSA-N
- SMILES: P1=PP=PP=P1

Properties
Chemical formula	P_{6}
Molar mass	185.842571988 g·mol^{−1}

Related compounds
Related compounds	Benzene; Hexazine; Borazine; Carborazine; Aluminazine; Caraluminazine
- Except where otherwise noted, data are given for materials in their standard state (at 25 °C [77 °F], 100 kPa). Infobox references

Hexaphosphabenzene is a hypothetical molecular allotrope of phosphorus and analogue of benzene, with chemical formula P_{6}. It is expected to share the planar structure of benzene, to which it is valence-isoelectronic, due to resonance stabilization and its sp^{2} nature. The pure substance has not been synthesized, but it has been studied computationally and some complexes have been synthesized.

== Predicted stability ==
Although several other allotropes of phosphorus are stable, no evidence for the existence of P_{6} has been reported. Preliminary ab initio calculations on the trimerisation of P_{2} leading to the formation of the cyclic P_{6} were performed, and it was predicted that hexaphosphabenzene would decompose to free P_{2} with an energy barrier of 13−15.4 kcal mol^{−1}, and would therefore not be observed in the uncomplexed state under normal experimental conditions. The presence of an added solvent, such as ethanol, might lead to the formation of intermolecular hydrogen bonds which may block the destabilizing interaction between phosphorus lone pairs and consequently stabilize P_{6}. The moderate barrier suggests that hexaphosphabenzene could be synthesized from a [2+2+2] cycloaddition of three P_{2} molecules. Currently, this is a synthetic endeavour which remains to be conquered.

== Synthesis ==
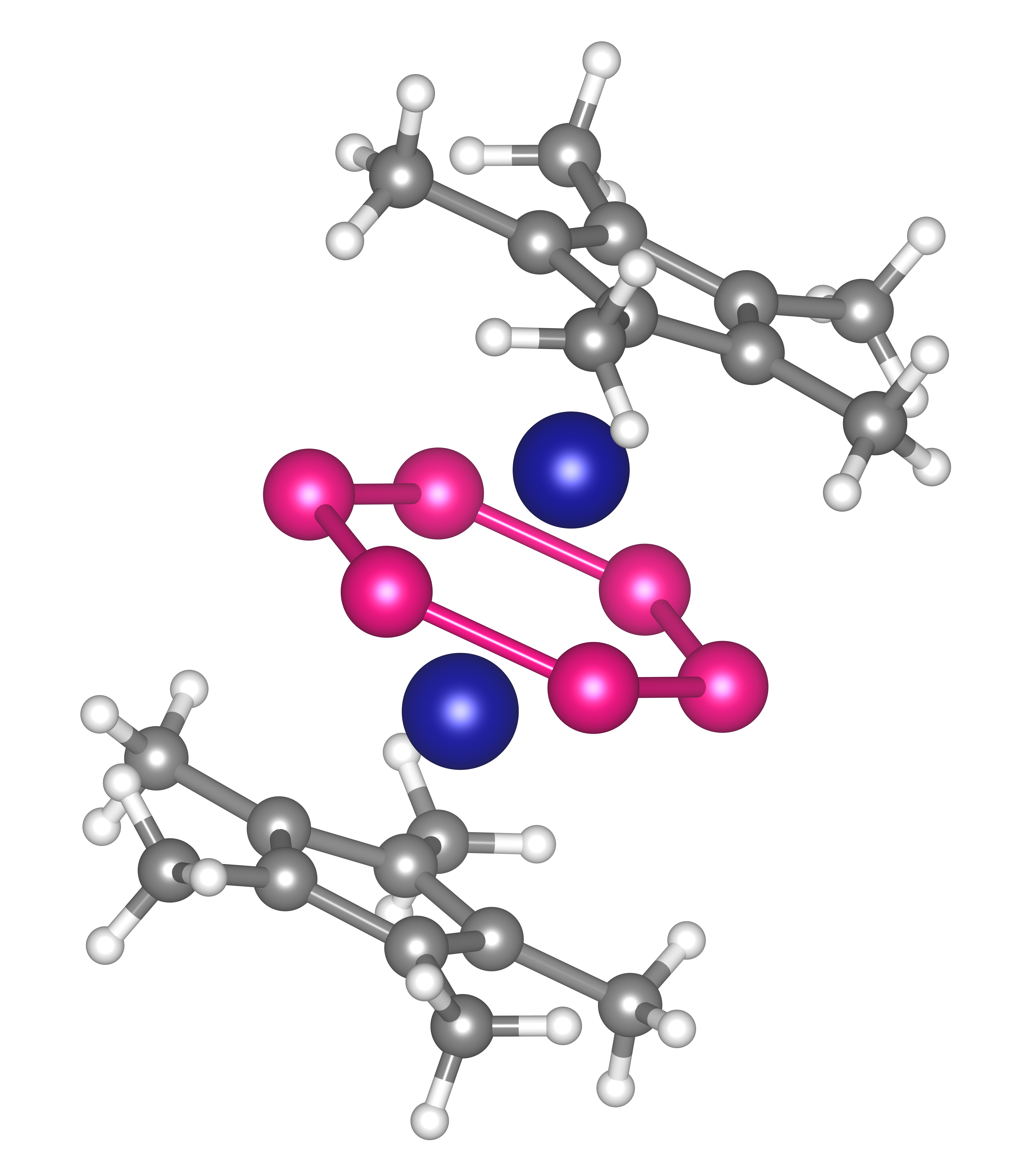
Structure of [{(η^{5}-Me_{5}C_{5})Mo}_{2}(μ,η^{6}-P_{6})

Isolation of hexaphosphabenzene was first achieved within a triple-decker sandwich complex in 1985 by Scherer et al. Amber coloured, air-stable crystals of [{(η^{5}-Me_{5}C_{5})Mo}_{2}(μ,η^{6}-P_{6})] are formed by reaction of [CpMo(CO)_{2}_{/}_{3}]_{2} with excess P_{4} in dimethylbenzene, albeit with a yield of approximately 1%. The crystal structure of this complex is a centrosymmetric molecule, and both five-membered rings as well as the central bridge-ligand P_{6} ring are planar and parallel. The average P–P distance for the hexaphosphabenzene within this complex is 2.170 Å.

Thirty years later, Fleischmann et al. improved the synthetic yield of [{(η^{5}-Me_{5}C_{5})Mo}_{2}(μ,η^{6}-P_{6})] up to 64%. This was achieved by increasing the reaction temperature of the thermolysis of [CpMo(CO)_{2}_{/}_{3}]_{2} with P_{4} to approximately 205 °C in boiling diisopropylbenzene, thus favouring the formation of [{(η^{5}-Me_{5}C_{5})Mo}_{2}(μ,η^{6}-P_{6})] as the thermodynamic product.

Several analogues of this P_{6} triple‐decker complex where the coordinating metal and η^{5}-ligand has been varied have also been reported. These include P_{6} triple‐decker complexes for Ti, V, Nb, and W, whereby the synthetic method is still based on the originally reported thermolysis of [CpM(CO)_{2}_{/}_{3}]_{2} with P_{4}.

== Electron count ==
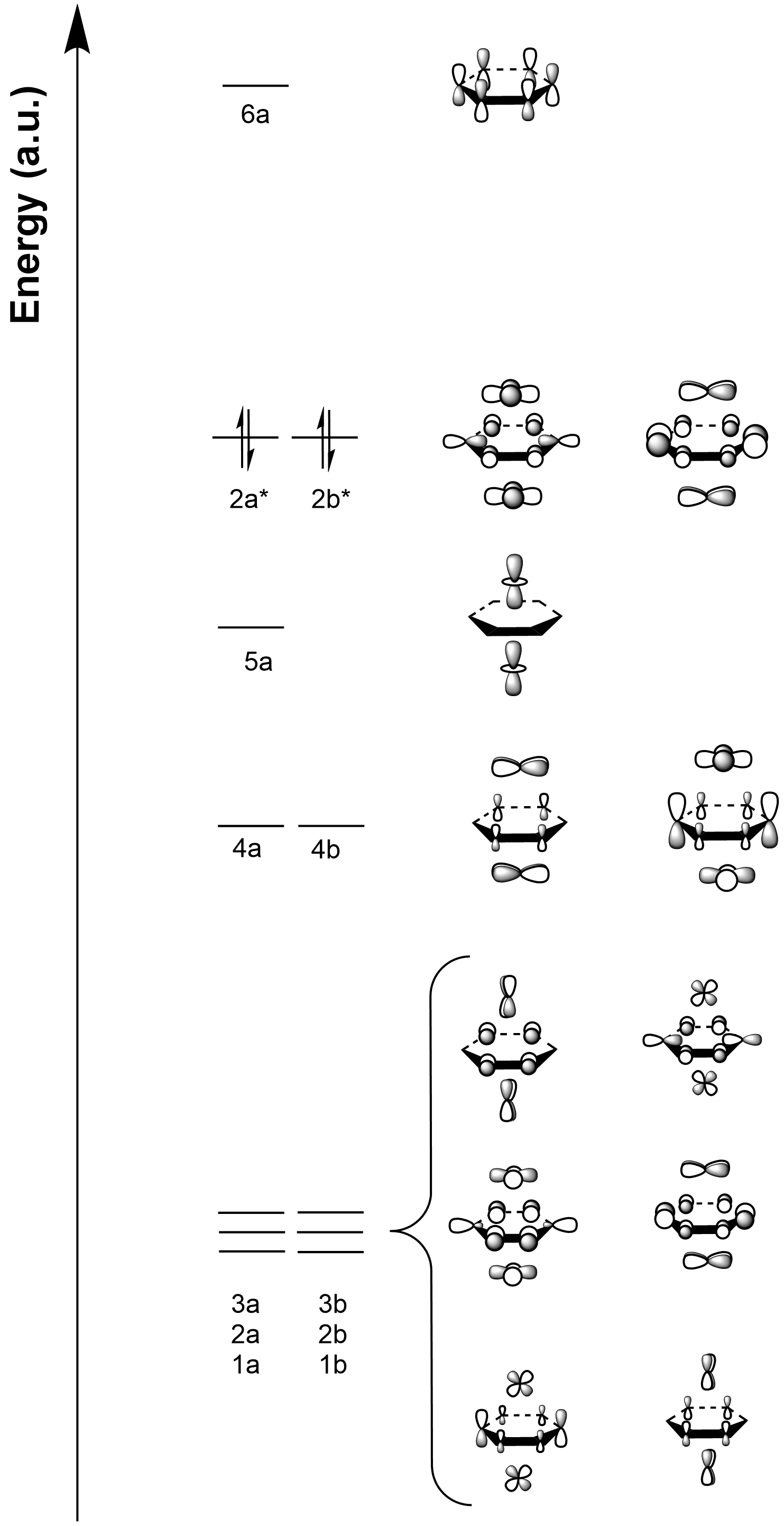
The dominant MOs responsible for ligand metal interactions in the triple-decker sandwich complexes, imposed on a qualitative energy diagram for [{(η^{5}-Cp)Mo}_{2}(μ,η^{6}-P_{6})]

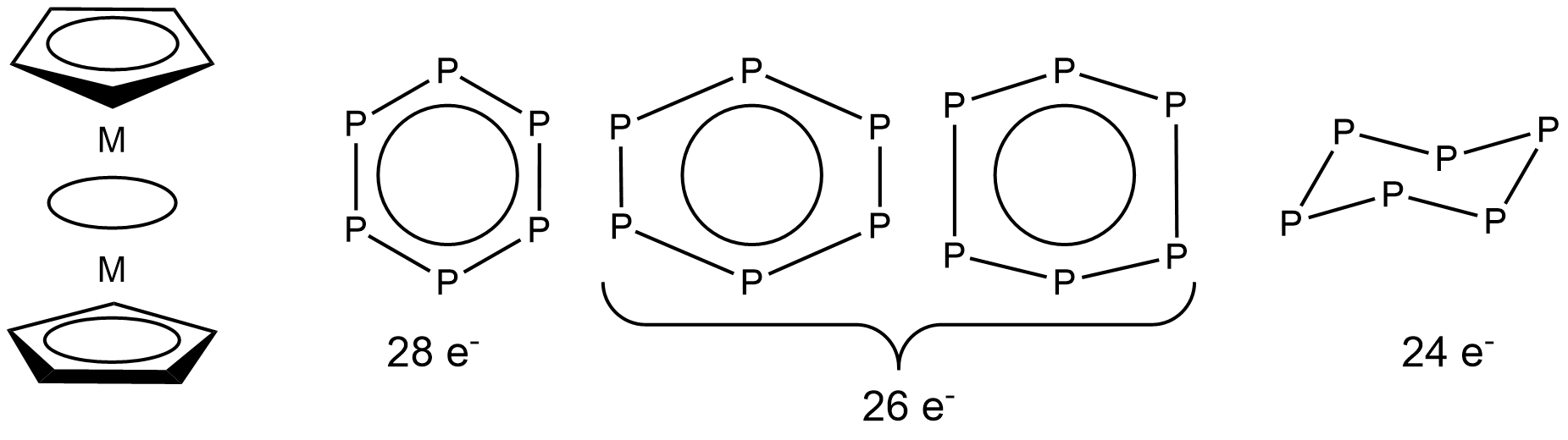
Geometry of the middle P_{6} ring in triple-decker sandwich complexes with 28, 26, and 24 valence electron counts

If one regards the planar P_{6} ring as a 6π electron donor ligand, then [{(η^{5}-Me_{5}C_{5})Mo}_{2}(μ,η^{6}-P_{6})] is a triple-decker sandwich complex with 28 valence electrons. If P_{6}, similar to C_{6}H_{6}, is taken as a 10π electron donor, a 32 valence electron count may be obtained. In most triple-decker complexes with an electron count ranging from 26 to 34, the structure of the middle ring is planar ([{(η^{5}-Cp)M}_{2}(μ,η^{6}-P_{6})] with M = Mo, Sc, Y, Zr, Hf, V, Nb, Ta, Cr, and W). In the 24 valence electron [{(η^{5}-Cp)Ti}_{2}(μ,η^{6}-P_{6})] complex, however, a distortion is observed, and the P_{6} ring is puckered.

Calculations have concluded that completely filled 2a*and 2b* orbitals in 28 valence electron complexes lead to a planar symmetrical P_{6} middle ring. In 26 valence electron complexes, the occupancy of either 2a*or 2b* results in in-plane or bisallylic distortions and an asymmetric planar middle ring. The puckering of P_{6} in 24 valence electron complexes is due to the stabilization of 5a, as well as that conferred by the tetravalent oxidation state of Ti in [{(η^{5}-Cp)Ti}_{2}(μ,η^{6}-P_{6})].

== Reactivity ==
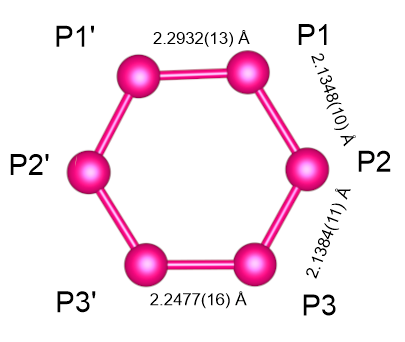
Bisallylic distorted P_{6} ligand within the molecular structure of the [[{(η^{5}- Me_{5}C_{5})Mo}_{2}(μ,η^{6}-P_{6})]]^{+} cation

=== One-electron oxidation ===
The reactivity of [{(η^{5}- Me_{5}C_{5})Mo}_{2}(μ,η^{6}-P_{6})] toward silver and copper monocationic salts of the weakly coordinating anion [Al{OC(CF_{3})_{3}}_{4}]^{−} ([TEF]) was studied by Fleischmann et al. in 2015. Addition of a solution of Ag[TEF] or Cu[TEF] to a solution of [{(η^{5}- Me_{5}C_{5})Mo}_{2}(μ,η^{6}-P_{6})] in chloroform results in oxidation of the complex, which can be observed by an immediate colour change from amber to dark teal. The magnetic moment of the dark teal crystals determined by the Evans NMR method is equal to 1.67 μB, which is consistent with one unpaired electron. Accordingly, [{(η^{5}- Me_{5}C_{5})Mo}_{2}(μ,η^{6}-P_{6})]^{+} is detected by ESI mass spectrometry.

The crystal structure of the teal product shows that the triple‐decker geometry is retained during the one‐electron oxidation of [{(η^{5}- Me_{5}C_{5})Mo}_{2}(μ,η^{6}-P_{6})]. The Mo—Mo bond length of the [{(η^{5}- Me_{5}C_{5})Mo}_{2}(μ,η^{6}-P_{6})]^{+} cation is 2.6617(4) Å; almost identical to the bond length determined for the unoxidized species at 2.6463(3) Å. However, the P—P bond lengths are strongly affected by the oxidation. While the P1—P1′ and P3—P3′ bonds are elongated, the remaining P—P bonds are shortened compared to the average P—P bond length of about 2.183 Å in the unoxidized species. Therefore, the middle deck of the 27 valence electron [{(η^{5}- Me_{5}C_{5})Mo}_{2}(μ,η^{6}-P_{6})]^{+} complex can best be described as a bisallylic distorted P_{6} ligand, intermediate between the 28 valence electron complexes with a perfectly planar symmetrical ring, and those with 26 valence electrons displaying a more amplified in-plane distortion. Density functional theorem (DFT) calculations confirm that this distortion is due to depopulation of the P bonding orbitals upon oxidation of the triple-decker sandwich complex.

=== Cu[TEF] & Ag[TEF] ===
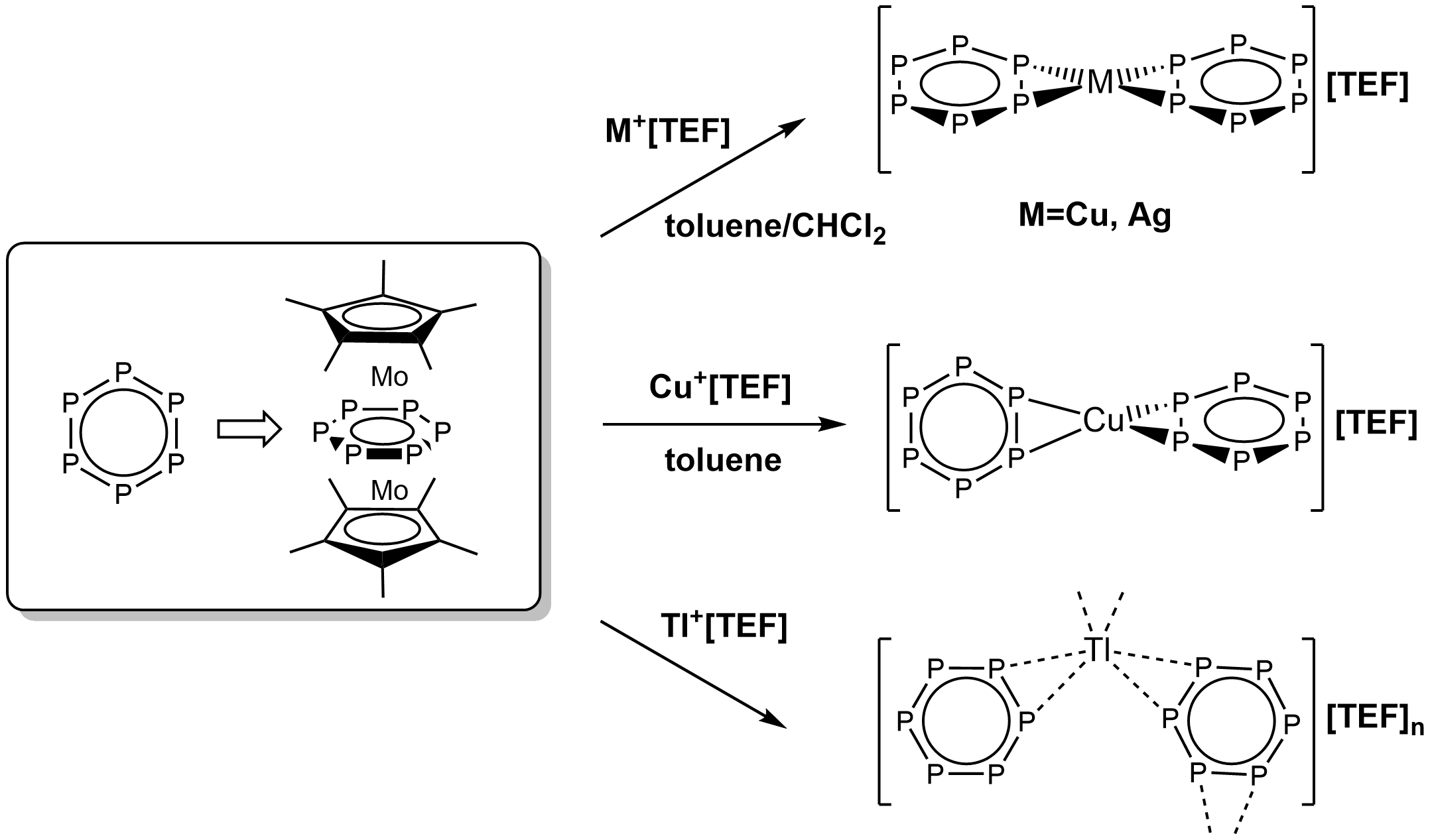
Reactivity of [{(η^{5}- Me_{5}C_{5})Mo}_{2}(μ,η^{6}-P_{6})] towards the cations Cu^{+}, Ag^{+}, and Tl^{+}

To avoid oxidation of [{(η^{5}- Me_{5}C_{5})Mo}_{2}(μ,η^{6}-P_{6})], further reactions were performed in toluene to decrease the redox potential of the cations. This resulted in a bright orange coordination product upon reaction with copper, although a mixture also containing the dark teal oxidation product was obtained upon reaction with silver.

Single‐crystal X‐ray analysis reveals that this product displays a distorted square‐planar coordination environment around the central cation through two side‐on coordinating P—P bonds. The Ag—P distances are approximately 2.6 Å, whereas the Cu—P distances are determined to be approximately 2.4 Å. The P—P bonds are therefore elongated to 2.2694(16) Å and 2.2915(14) Å upon coordination to copper and silver, respectively, whilst the remaining P—P bonds are unaffected.

In another experiment Cu[TEF] is treated with [{(η^{5}- Me_{5}C_{5})Mo}_{2}(μ,η^{6}-P_{6})] in pure toluene and the solution shows the bright orange color of the complex cation [Cu([{(η^{5}- Me_{5}C_{5})Mo}_{2}(μ,η^{6}-P_{6})])_{2}]^{+}. However, analysis of crystals from this solution reveals a distorted tetrahedral coordination environment around Cu. The resulting Cu—P distances are somewhat shorter than their counterparts discussed above. The coordinating P—P bonds are a little longer, which is attributed to less steric crowding in the tetrahedral coordination geometry around the Cu center.

The successful isolation of [Cu([{(η^{5}- Me_{5}C_{5})Mo}_{2}(μ,η^{6}-P_{6})])_{2}]^{+} either as its tetrahedral or square‐planar isomer is therefore achievable. DFT calculations show that the enthalpy for the tetrahedral to square‐planar isomerization is positive for both metals, with the tetrahedral coordination being favored. When entropy is taken into account, small positive values for Cu^{+} and larger, but negative, values for Ag^{+} are observed. This means that the tetrahedral geometry is predominant for Cu^{+}, but a significant percentage of the complexes adopt a square‐planar geometry in solution. For Ag^{+}, the equilibrium is shifted significantly to the right side, which is presumably why a tetrahedral coordination of [{(η^{5}- Me_{5}C_{5})Mo}_{2}(μ,η^{6}-P_{6})] and Ag^{+} has not yet been observed.

Examination of the crystal packing reveals that these products are layered compounds that crystallize in the monoclinic C2/c space group with alternating negatively charged layers of the [TEF] anions and positively charged layers of isolated [M([{(η^{5}- Me_{5}C_{5})Mo}_{2}(μ,η^{6}-P_{6})])_{2}]^{+} complexes. The layers lie inside the bc plane, alternate along the a axis, and do not form a two‐dimensional network.

=== Tl[TEF] ===
The treatment of [{(η^{5}- Me_{5}C_{5})Mo}_{2}(μ,η^{6}-P_{6})] with Tl[TEF] in chloroform gives an immediate color change from amber to a deep red. The crystal structure reveals a trigonal pyramidal coordination of the thallium cation, Tl^{+}, by three side‐on coordinating P—P bonds of the P_{6} ligands. Two of these P_{6} ligands show shorter and uniform Tl—P distances of 3.2–3.3 Å with P—P bonds elongated to about 2.22 Å, whilst the third unit shows an unsymmetrical coordination with long Tl—P distances of approximately 3.42 and 3.69 Å and no P—P bond elongation.

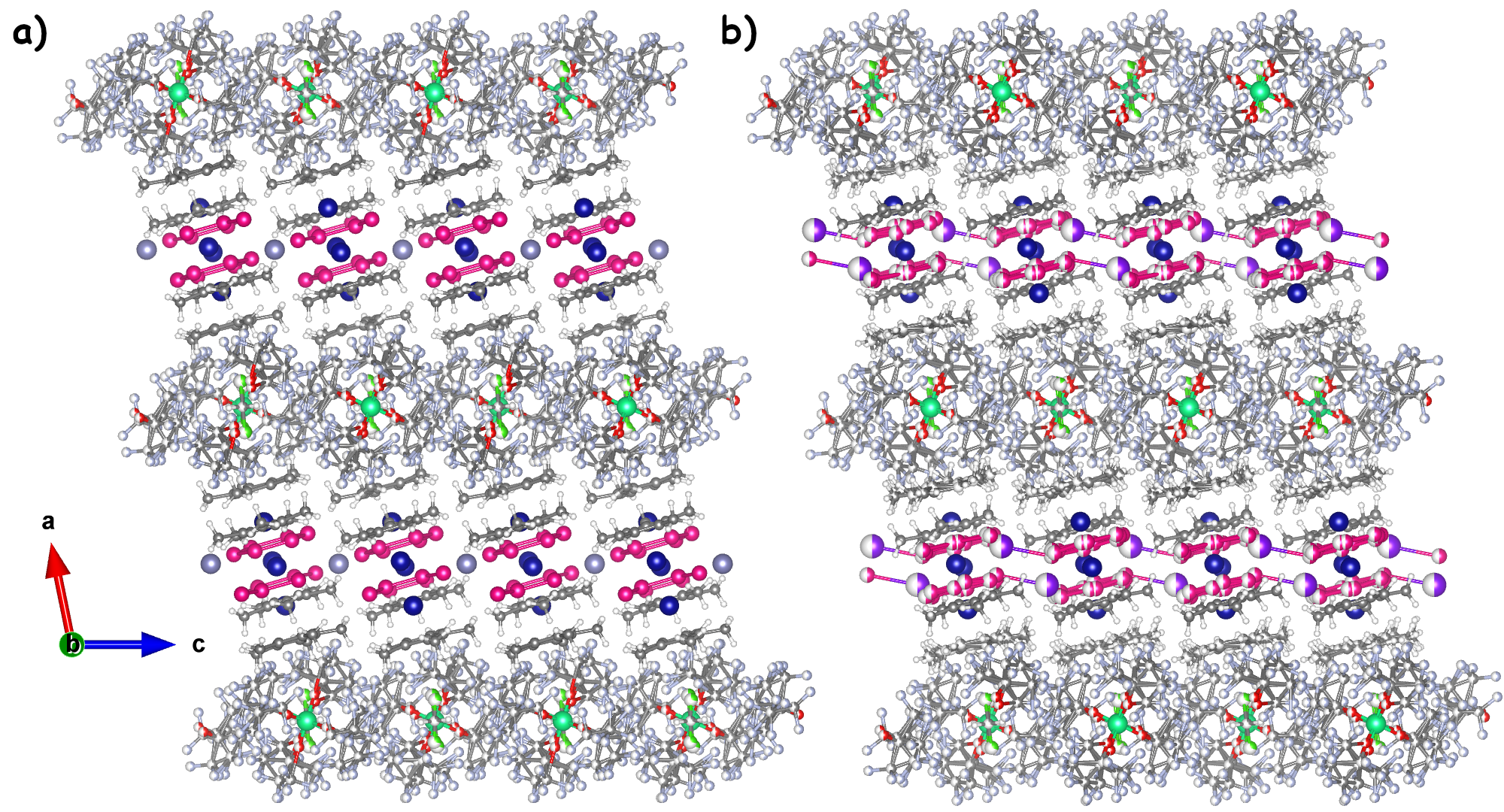
Crystal packing of a) [Ag([{(η^{5}- Me_{5}C_{5})Mo}_{2}(μ,η^{6}-P_{6})])_{2}]^{+}and b) [Tl([{(η^{5}- Me_{5}C_{5})Mo}_{2}(μ,η^{6}-P_{6})])_{2}]^{+} showing the alternation of anionic and cationic layers along the a axis. Tl^{+} positions are half‐occupied.

Although the environment of Tl^{+} is distinctly different from that of Cu^{+} and Ag^{+}, their structures are related by the two‐dimensional coordination network that propagates inside the bc plane. Crucially, whilst Cu^{+} and Ag^{+} form layered structures with isolated [M([{(η^{5}- Me_{5}C_{5})Mo}_{2}(μ,η^{6}-P_{6})])_{2}]^{+} complex cations, there is a statistical distribution of the Tl^{+} cations inside the two‐dimensional coordination, which shows further interconnection of the P_{6} ligands to form an extended 2D network that could be regarded as a supramolecular analogue of graphene.

== Jahn–Teller distortion ==
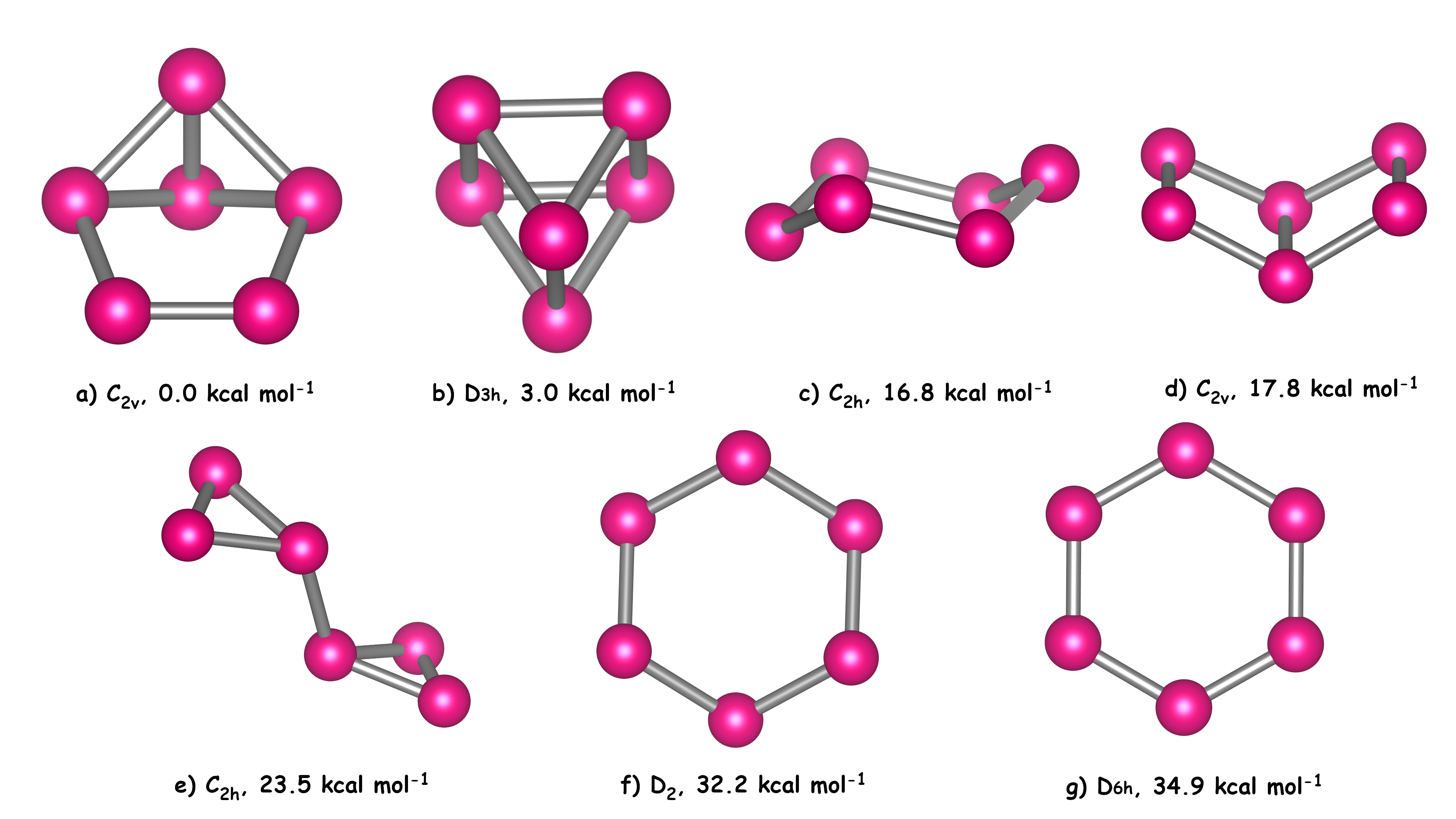
Representative structures of P_{6}. Included are point group symmetries and relative energies.

Despite the triple-decker sandwich complex {(η^{5}-Me_{5}C_{5})Mo}_{2}(μ,η^{6}-P_{6}) containing a demonstrably planar P_{6} ring with equal P—P bond lengths, theoretical calculations reveal that there are at least 7 non-planar P_{6} isomers lower in energy than the planar benzene-like D_{6h} structure. In increasing order of energy these are: benzvalene, prismane, chair, Dewar benzene, bicyclopropenyl, distorted benzene, and benzene.

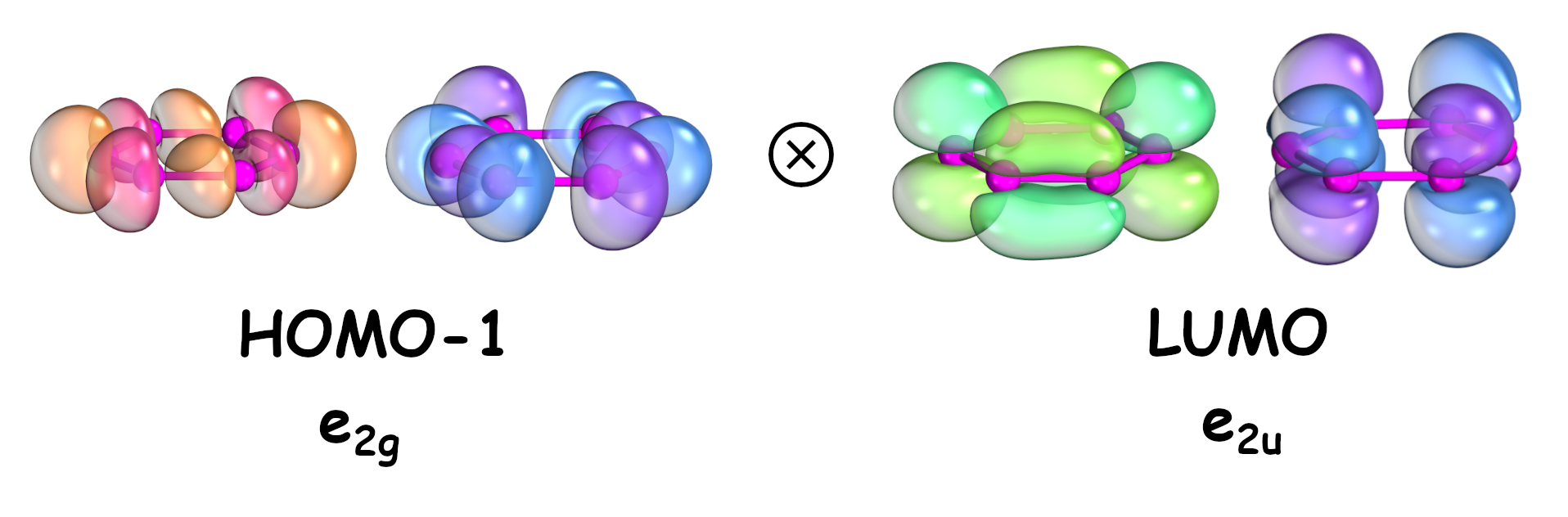
Interaction of the pairs of occupied and unoccupied molecular orbitals of P_{6} responsible for the distortion of the planar D_{6h} structure toward the distorted D_{2} structure

A pseudo Jahn–Teller effect (PJT) is responsible for distortion of the D_{6h} benzene-like structure into the D_{2} structure, which occurs along the e_{2u} doubly degenerate mode as a result of vibronic coupling of the HOMO − 1 (e_{2g}) and LUMO (e_{2u}): e_{2g} ⊗ e_{2u} = a_{1u} ⊕ a_{2u} ⊕ e_{2u}. The distorted structure is calculated to lie just 2.7 kcal mol^{−1} lower in energy than the D_{6h} structure. If the uncomplexed structure were to be successfully synthesized, the aromaticity of the benzene-like P_{6} structure would not be sufficient to stabilize the planar geometry, and the PJT effect would result in distortion of the ring.

=== Isomers ===
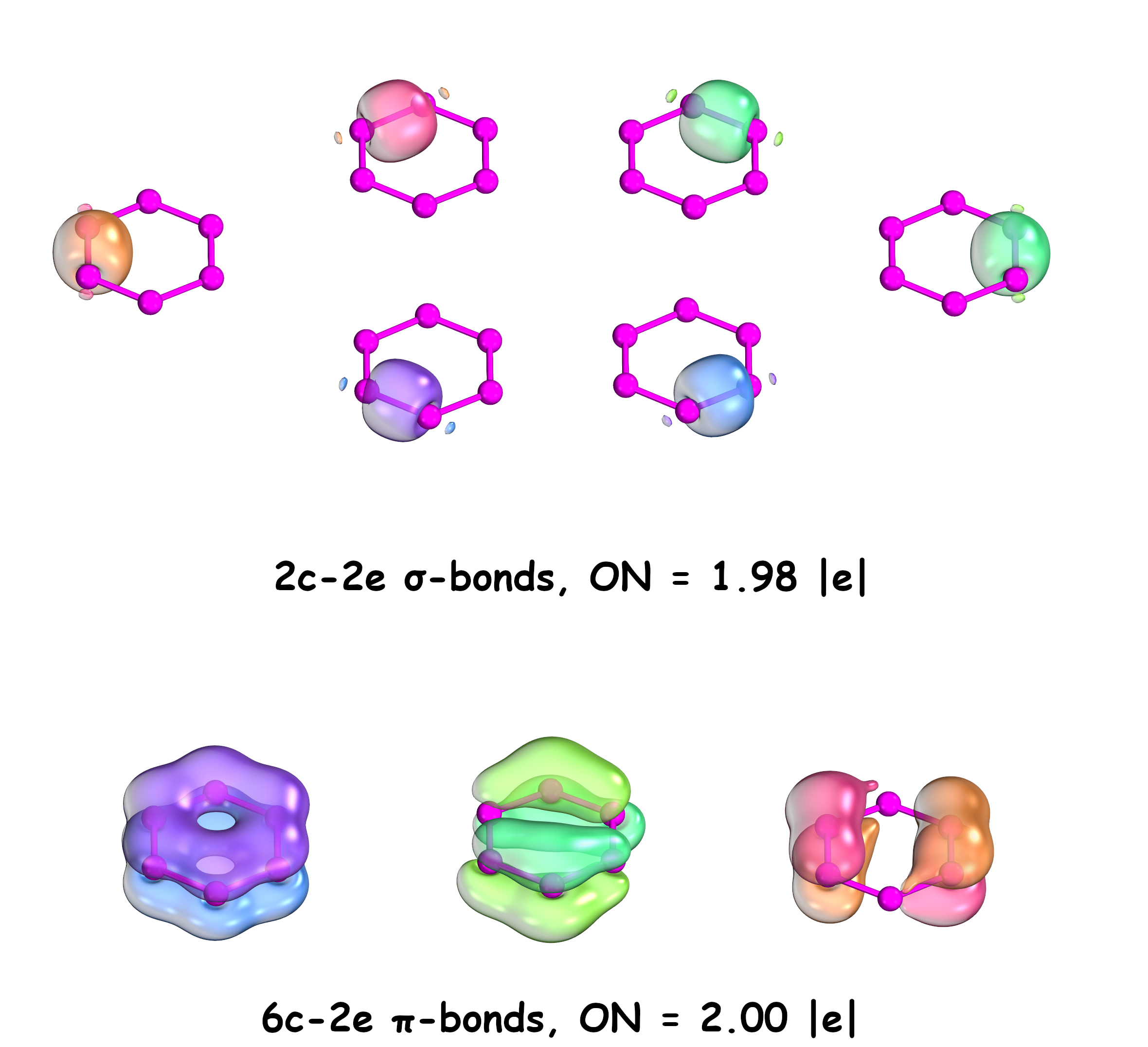
Chemical bonding picture of g). AdNDP analysis performed by Galeev and Boldyrev.

Adaptive Natural Density Partitioning (AdNDP) is a theoretical tool developed by Alexander Boldyrev that is based on the concept of the electron pair as the main element of chemical bonding models. It can therefore recover Lewis bonding elements such as 1c–2e core electrons and lone pairs, 2c–2e objects which are two-center two-electron bonds, as well as delocalized many-center bonding elements with respect to aromaticity.

The AdNDP analysis of the seven representative low-lying P_{6} structures reveal that these are well described by the classical Lewis model. A lone pair on each phosphorus atom, a two-center-two-electron (2c–2e) σ-bond in every pair of adjacent P atoms, and an additional 2c–2e π-bond between adjacent 2-coordinated P atoms are found, with occupation numbers (ON) of all these bonding elements above 1.92 |e|.

The chemical bonding in the chair structure is unusual. Based on fragment orbital analysis, it was concluded that two linkages between the two P_{3} fragments are of the one-electron hemibond type. The AdNDP analysis reveals a lone pair on each P atom and six 2c–2e P—P σ-bonds. One 3c–2e π-bond in every P_{3} triangle was revealed with the user-directed form of the AdNDP analysis, as well as a 4c–2e bond responsible for bonding between the two P_{3} triangle, confirming that this isomer cannot be represented by a single Lewis structure, and requires a resonance of two Lewis structures, or can be described by a single formula with delocalized bonding elements.

Both the D_{6h} benzene-like structure, as well as the D_{2} isomer of P_{6} is similar to the reported AdNDP bonding pattern of the C_{6}H_{6} benzene molecule: 2c–2e σ-bond and lone pairs, as well as delocalized 6c-2e π-bonds. The distortion due to the PJT effect therefore does not significantly disturb the bonding picture.

=== Suppression ===
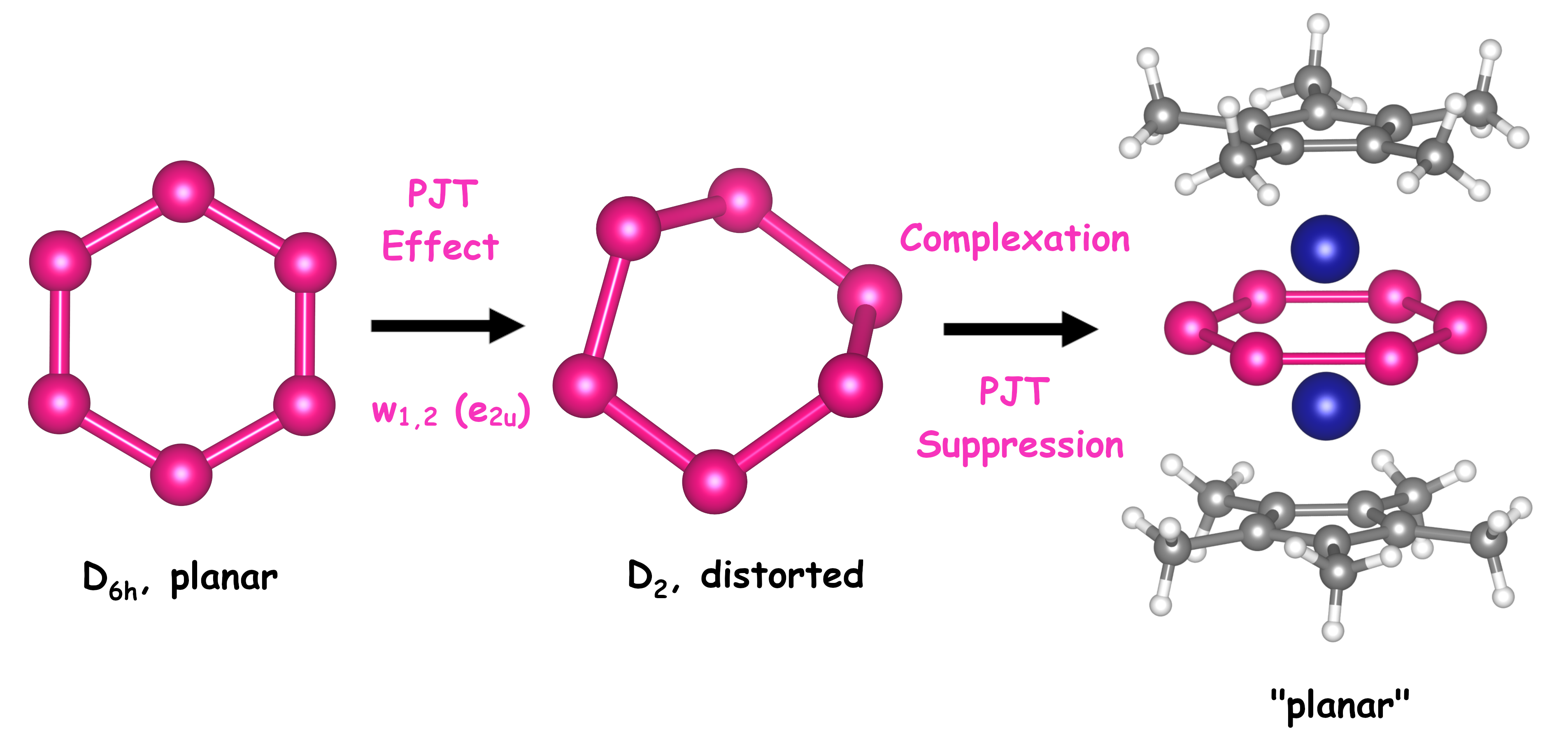
Suppression of the pseudo Jahn–Teller effect in P_{6} upon complexation in a sandwich compound

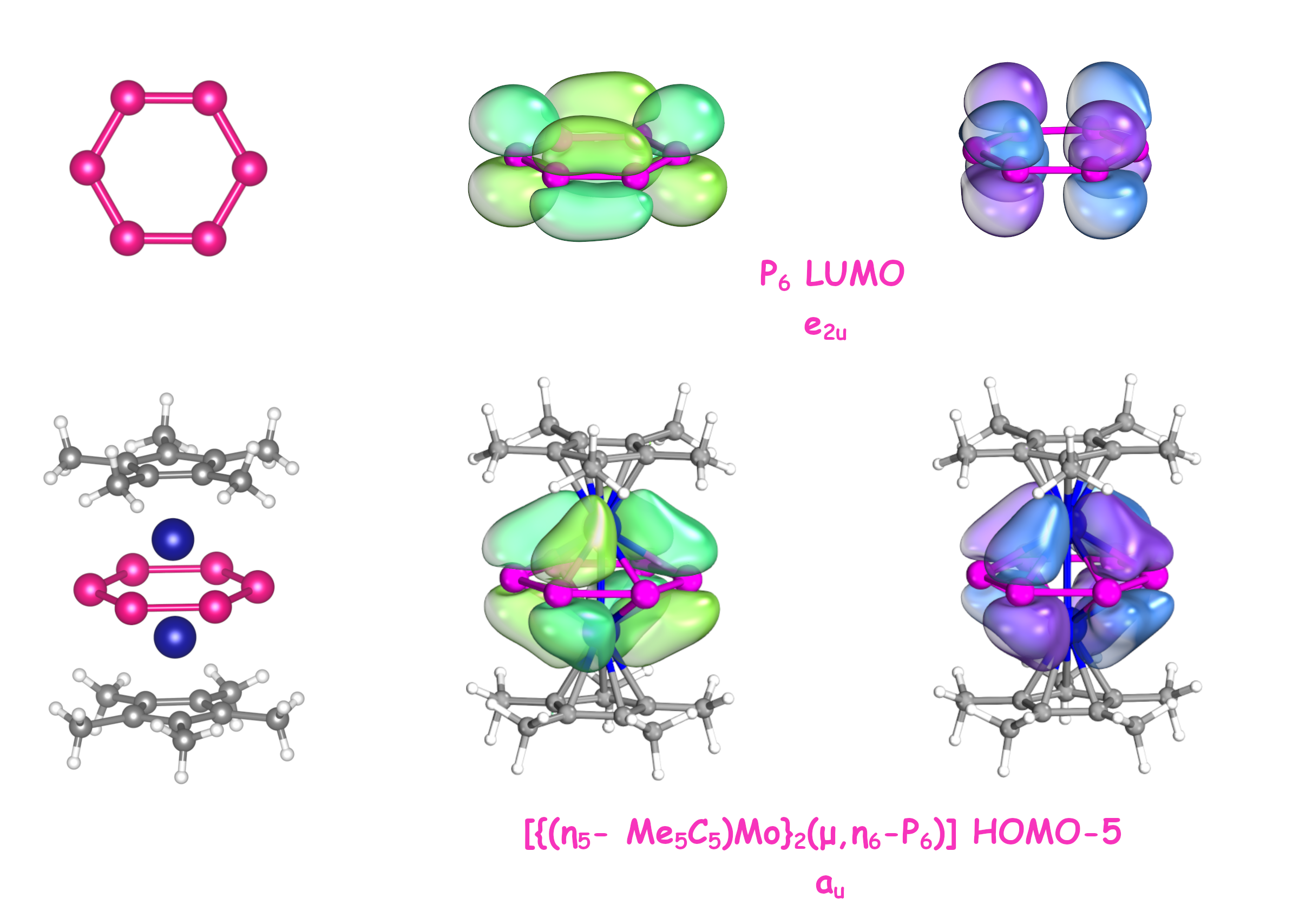
Correspondence of unoccupied molecular orbitals of P_{6} to those of [{(η^{5}- Me_{5}C_{5})Mo}_{2}(μ,η^{6}-P_{6})]. Occupation in the latter results in suppression of the PJT effect.

The planar P_{6} hexagonal structure D_{6h} is a second-order saddle point due to the pseudo-Jahn–Teller effect (PJT), which leads to the D_{2} distorted structure. Upon sandwich complex formation the PJT effect is suppressed due to filling of the unoccupied molecular orbitals involved in vibronic coupling in P_{6} with electron pairs of Mo atoms. Specifically, from molecular orbital analysis it was determined that, upon complex formation, the LUMO in the isolated P_{6} structure is now occupied in the triple-decker complex as a result of the appreciable δ-type M → L back-donation mechanism from the occupied d_{x}^{2}_{–y}^{2} and d_{xy} atomic orbitals of the Mo atom into the partially antibonding π molecular orbitals of P_{6}, thus restoring the high symmetry and planarity of P_{6}.
