= Hermann Arthur Jahn =

British scientist of German descent who co-identified the Jahn-Teller effect

- Born: 31 May 1907; Colchester, England
- Died: 24 October 1979 (aged 72); Southampton, England
- Education: University College, London (BSc, 1928); University of Leipzig (PhD)
- Known for: Jahn–Teller effect
- Scientific career
- Fields: Quantum Mechanics
- Workplaces: University of Southampton
- Doctoral advisor: Werner Heisenberg

Hermann Arthur Jahn (German pronunciation: [ˈhɛrman ˈartuːɐ̯ ˈjaːn]) (31 May 1907 in Colchester, England – 24 October 1979 in Southampton) was a British scientist of German descent. With Edward Teller, he identified the Jahn–Teller effect.

He is not to be confused with Hermann Jahn, the 20th Century German politician, or Hermann Jahn the 20th Century German biologist.

== Early life ==
He was the son of Friedrich Wilhelm Hermann Jahn and Marion May Curtiss. He attended City School in Lincoln.

Jahn received his Bachelor of Science degree in chemistry at University College, London in 1928. He received his PhD on 14 February 1935 under the supervision of Werner Heisenberg at the University of Leipzig. The title of his dissertation was "The rotation and oscillation of the methane molecule". From 1935 to 1941 he did research at the Davy Faraday Research Laboratory at the Royal Institution in London.

== Career ==
From 1941 to 1946, he was based at the Royal Aircraft Establishment at Farnborough Airfield. He was (the first) Professor of Applied Mathematics at the University of Southampton from 1949 to 1972. He published scientific papers on quantum mechanics and group theory.

== Personal life ==
He married Karoline Schüler in 1943 in Hendon. They had a son (born 1944) and a daughter (born 1946). Jahn died in 1979, aged 72.
