= Isaac B. Bersuker =

Moldovan-American theoretical physicist

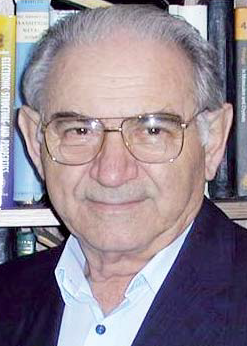
- Bersuker in 2008
- Born: Isaac Borukhovich Bersuker; February 12, 1928 (age 98); Chișinău, Kingdom of Romania
- Citizenship: United States; Moldova
- Education: Moldova State University (M.Sc.); Leningrad State University (Ph.D.)
- Known for: Tunneling splitting in polyatomic systems with Jahn–Teller effect and pseudo Jahn–Teller effect Vibronic theory of ferroelectricity and related properties of cubic perovskites Theory of core polarization in Rydberg atoms Quantum chemistry of coordination complexes Electron-conformational approach to drug design and fragrance activity.
- Spouse: Lilia B. Bersuker (m. 1951)
- Awards: Moldavian SSR State Prize in Science and Technology (1979); Order of Honour (Moldova) (2004); The Medal "Scientific Merit", I class (Moldova) (2021)
- Scientific career
- Fields: Chemical Physics and Physical Chemistry, Theoretical Chemistry, Theoretical Physics, Condensed Matter Physics
- Workplaces: The University of Texas at Austin; Academy of Sciences of Moldova

Signature
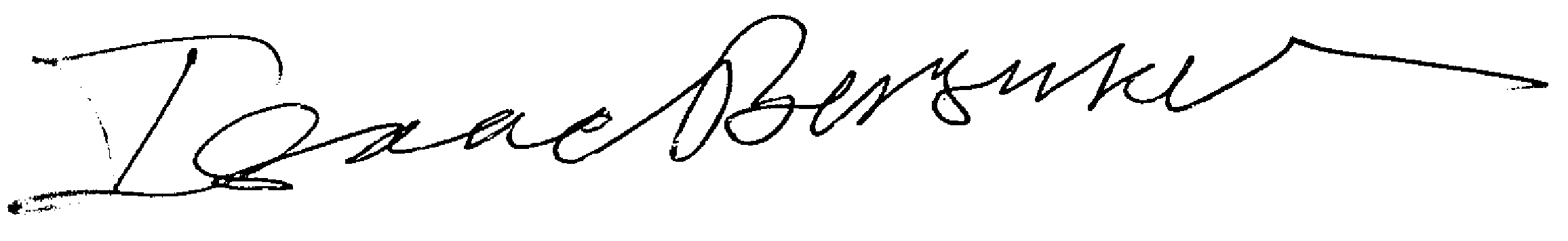

Isaac B. Bersuker (Russian: Исаáк Бóрухович (Бори́сович) Берсýкер; born February 12, 1928) is a Romanian-born Soviet-Moldovan-American theoretical physicist and quantum chemist whose principal research is in chemical physics, solid-state physics, and theoretical chemistry. Known for his "life-long years of experience in theoretical chemistry" working on the electronic structure and properties of coordination compounds, Isaac B. Bersuker is "one of the most widely recognized authorities" in the theory of the Jahn–Teller effect (JTE) and the pseudo-Jahn–Teller effect (PJTE). His accomplishments include explaining the polarization of the atomic core in Rydberg atoms, the effect of tunneling splitting in molecules and solids with a strong JTE, and the discovery of the PJTE origin of ferroelectricity in cubic perovskites. For many years, known as the leading expert in JTE and PJTE, Bersuker has served as the permanent chairman of the international steering committee of the Jahn–Teller symposia. His present affiliation is with the Oden Institute for Computational Engineering and Science of the Department of Chemistry of the University of Texas at Austin. According to Google Scholar, he published 493 titles, including books, review articles, regular articles, and short communications.

== Early life, education, and career ==
Isaac (Izya) Bersuker was born on February 12, 1928, in Chișinău, then part of Greater Romania, to a low-income family of Bessarabian Jewish descent. His father Boruch Bersuker was a carpenter, and his mother Bella Bersuker (Russian: Бéлла Хáймовна Берсýкер, 1896–1981) was a housewife with five kids. As a boy in a family of a modest background, Isaac got his elementary school education in Talmud Torah and ORT. He was 13 years old when the tragic events of World War II forced his Jewish family to run from the Nazis to an Azerbaijan village. Deprived of the traditional middle and high-school education, he spent four years farming in Azerbaijan kolkhoz. After the war, native Romanian, he barely spoke Russian. Yet, in a self-education way, in а two-year term, he managed to complete a four-year high-school program in a Russian school and enrolled at Chișinău State University. A fascinating autobiographical section in describes "his scientific ascent, starting from a Jewish childhood in Bessarabia and frequently hampered by antisemitic state directives under the Stalin regime." Dedicated to the study of theoretical physics, in 1952, Bersuker graduated from the university with a master's degree in physics. He began his scientific research in atomic spectroscopy as a post-graduate student at Leningrad State University, working under Mikhail Veselov at the Division of Quantum Mechanics led by its Chair Vladimir A. Fock. Here, in 1957, Bersuker received his Candidate of Sciences degree and in 1964 his Doctor of Sciences degree. From 1964 to 1993, back in Chișinău, Bersuker continued his scientific research at the Institute of Chemistry of the Moldavian branch of the USSR Academy of Sciences. In 1964, he founded the Laboratory of Quantum Chemistry also dubbed the Chișinău school of the Jahn–Teller effect. Elected as a Corresponding Member of this academy in 1972 and a full Member in 1989, Bersuker moved to the United States. In 1993, he became a senior research scientist and professor of the department of chemistry at the University of Texas at Austin. Bersuker served as a doctoral and habilitation supervisor for 31 post-graduate students and post-docs. According to K. Alex Müller, Bersuker was and still is "in full swing at the university, writing books, discussing with great wit, and quick to understand". In the late 1980s, owing to Bersuker's high motivating role, leadership, and creative ingenuity, Bersuker's school was called "the capital of the Jahn–Teller effect" by some.

== Research ==
=== Atomic spectroscopy ===
In his Ph.D. thesis, Bersuker developed the theory of core polarization and its effect on optical transitions in Rydberg atoms. At the time, this was a puzzling problem in absorption spectroscopy. The absorption of light by alkali atoms appeared to violate the electric dipole sum rule. According to Bersuker, the solution to the problem is in the instantaneous polarization of the atomic core by the incident electromagnetic wave creating an additional perturbation to the excitation of the valence electron. Related to this problem, he worked out the adiabatic separation of motion of the valence and the atomic core electrons in electronic structure calculations of atoms. First introduced in 1957, still, decades later, Bersuker's ideas of electron polarization by the incident electromagnetic wave and of the atomic core polarization by the valence electron is used and further explored in atomic spectroscopy.

=== Jahn–Teller and pseudo Jahn–Teller effects ===
Bersuker's contributions to the JTE and PJTE theory with applications to physical and chemical phenomena are reflected in his several monographs (some of them written and published with the assistance and involvement of other authors) and major reviews on this subject (see the latest in). First published in 1961–1962, his contributions to the theory of the JTE predicted the tunneling splitting of the vibronic energy levels of the systems with the JTE, later confirmed experimentally. The splitting is due to the tunneling transitions between the equivalent wells on the multiminimum adiabatic potential energy surface produced by this effect. In 1976, "The phenomenon of tunneling splitting of energy levels of polyatomic systems in the state of electronic degeneracy" was qualified as a scientific discovery and registered in the State Register of the USSR (Diploma No. 202). In addition, Bersuker is known for revealing the significance of the PJTE and showing that it may take place at any energy gaps between entangled electronic states. Most important, he proved that the JTE and PJTE are the only sources of structural instability and spontaneous symmetry breaking (SSB) in polyatomic systems. Thus, according to Bersuker, if a polyatomic system has broken symmetry properties, undoubtedly, they are of JTE or PJTE origin. This conclusion elevates the two effects from their assumed earlier rare particular features to general tools for exploring molecular and solid-state properties.

The generality of this result was challenged by the existence of some molecular systems with SSB. For example, in the ozone O_{3} molecule, neither the JTE nor the PJTE is seen explicitly in the high-symmetry configuration. Bersuker eliminated this controversy by revealing the hidden JTE and PJTE. They take place in the excited states of the system but, being strong enough, penetrate the ground state of the high-symmetry configuration and form an additional, coexisting equilibrium state with lower symmetry. The latter may also have a different spin state leading to an interesting phenomenon of spin-crossover and magnetic-dielectric bistability. Involving excited states, Bersuker also showed that the PJTE is instrumental in explaining the origin of chemical activation and sudden polarization in photochemical reactions. Revealed by Bersuker, other applications of the JTE and PJTE are briefly mentioned below.

== Solid-state problems: ferroelectricity and multiferroicity ==
Another fundamental contribution of Isaac B. Bersuker to the early developments of this field was applying the PJTE to explain the origin of ferroelectricity in perovskite-type crystals. This first application of the PJTE to solve an important solid-state problem led to developing a whole trend in the studies of local and cooperative properties in crystals. The origin of crystals' temperature-controlled spontaneous dielectric polarization was the subject of discussion for many decades involving high-rank physicists at the time. However, with the development of the experimental technics, the "displacive theories" encountered increasing controversies that had no explanation.

Using perovskite crystals as an example, Bersuker showed (first in 1964, published in 1966) that the PJTE produces a spontaneous symmetry breaking resulting under certain conditions in local dipolar instability. It exists in all the crystal phases, and the spontaneous polarization results from the order-disorder interaction between these PJTE-induced local dipolar distortions. Performed in the local octahedral TiO_{6} center in the BaTiO_{3} crystal (taken as an example), where vibronic coupling mixes ground ^{1}A_{1g} and close in energy exited ^{1}T_{1u} states of opposite parity (but same multiplicity), detailed analysis with calculations proved the PJTE to produce the dipolar distortion. Thus, it shows that Bersuker's PJTE theory of ferroelectricity agrees with the available empirical data and predicts new properties, confirmed experimentally.

From the fact that PJTE does not entangle states with different spin multiplicity, Bersuker deduced conditions and predicted possible multiferroics in some cubic perovskites. According to Bersuker, only the d^{n} cations with the close-energy ground and excited states of opposite parity, but with the same multiplicity, may meet the necessary conditions of ferroelectricity in the presence of unpaired spins.

== Novel solid-state property: orientational polarization ==
Under external unipolar perturbations, polar gases and liquids manifest two kinds of polarization, displacive and orientational. The latter is by orders of magnitude larger than the former. So far, solids were known to undergo only displacive polarization. Bersuker showed that in ABO_{3} type perovskites, dipolar distortions are due to the PJTE. Similar to the other cases of the JTE and PJTE, the adiabatic potential energy surface of the metallic B center has eight equivalent wells positioned along the eight diagonals of the cube, meaning eight symmetry-equivalent positions of the PJTE-induced dipole moment with small barriers between them. As a result, these dipoles can rotate under external perturbations realizing orientational polarization. Predicted more than a century ago by P. Debye, solids with intrinsic dipoles behave like polar liquids with orientational polarization. However, enhanced polarizability of such solids was not well understood until Bersuker's works (see also in). As shown by Bersuker, experimentally observed giant flexoelectricity, permittivity, and electrostriction result from PJTE-induced orientational polarization.

== Molecular puckering (buckling) and its suppression ==
Given that the PJTE is the unique source of structural instability, Bersuker applied this idea to planar configurations of some molecules in nondegenerate states. Bersuker was the first to demonstrate that the puckering (or buckling) of planar two-dimensional systems is of PJTE origin. Hence, following Bersuker, their planarity can be driven by external influence targeting the PJTE parameters. As the starting example, he suggested hemoglobin oxygenation. The out-of-plane displacement of the iron atom was shown to be due to the PJTE. At the same time, the coordination of the oxygen atom violates the condition of the PJTE instability, thus restoring the planar configuration. In a more general setup, such manipulations became more critical recently because of the applications of two-dimensional molecular systems in electronics. According to Bersuker, planarity can be operated by targeted redox perturbations, coordination with other atomic groups, and chemical substitutions. A similar modification of a crystal lattice by redox influencing its local JTE centers was also realized.

== Other problems ==
There is quite a list of other theoretical chemistry, chemical physics, and quantum chemistry fields with a remarkable Bersuker's contribution. In a number of his seminal papers, Bersuker introduced and developed theoretical models of vibronic mechanisms in redox properties, electron-conformational effects, chemical reactivity, and catalysis. He is known for revealing the role of JTE and PJTE in the properties of mixed-valence compounds. In addition, he discovered the effect of coordination covalent bonding and the JTE in the "plasticity effect". Also, Bersuker worked out a quantum mechanics/molecular mechanics method of electronic structure calculations of large organometallic systems when there is charge transfer between the QM and MM parts. The name of Bersuker is associated with the semiempirical approach to relativistic electronic structure calculations and a method of estimating molecular-orbital parameters from Mossbauer spectra. In another series of publications, he created and applied the electron-conformational method to computer-aided drug design and toxicology. Within this methodology, the chemical origin of odorant activity was also revealed, including the source of musk odor.

== Selected books ==
Isaac B. Bersuker wrote 16 books, first in 1962, and more than 400 academic papers. His books on the JTE and PJTE, published in 1984, 1989, and 2006, were most influential. According to Google Scholar, cumulatively, these three monographs were cited more than 3000 times.

- Bersuker I. B. and Ablov A. V., (1962) Chemical Bonds in Complex Compounds, [in Russian], AN MoldavSSR, Chișinău, 208 p., ASIN: B072L33R79
- Bersuker I. B. (1971) ''Structure and Properties of Coordination Compounds'' [in Russian], Khimia, Leningrad, ASIN: B0725HWXD4
- Bersuker I. B., (1984) ''The Jahn–Teller Effect and Vibronic Interactions in Modern Chemistry'', Plenum, New York, 320 p., ISBN 978-1-4612-9654-6
- Bersuker I. B. and Polinger V. Z. (1989), Vibronic Interactions in Molecules and Crystals, Springer-Verlag, Berlin-Heidelberg-New York, ISBN 978-3-642-83481-3
- Bersuker I. B. (2006), The Jahn–Teller Effect, Cambridge University Press, Cambridge (UK), 2006; ISBN 978-0-521-82212-1
- Bersuker I. B. (2010). Electronic Structure and Properties of Transition Metal Compounds: Introduction to the theory (2nd ed.), Wiley, Hoboken, NJ, 759 p., ISBN 978-0470180235
- Bersuker I. B. and Yang Liu, (2025). Electronic Structure and Properties of Transition Metal Compounds: Theory and Applications (3rd ed.), Wiley, Hoboken, NJ, 864 p., ISBN 978-1-394-17889-6

== Awards and honors ==
- Moldavian SSR State Prize in Science and Technology (1979)
- Order of Honor (Moldova) (2004)
- The Medal "Scientific Merit", I class (Moldova) (2021)

== Webinars, seminars, etc ==
- Webinar "SPONTANEOUS SYMMETRY BREAKING AND JAHN-TELLER EFFECTS" dedicated to the 95th birthday of Academician Isaac BERSUKER , YouTube video record (2023)

== Personal life ==
Isaac B. Bersuker was married in 1951 to Liliya Bersuker (Russian: Ли́лия Бори́совна Берсýкер, 1930–2003), a chemist. He has one son, Gennadi I. Bersuker (born 1953), a theoretical physicist, and two grandsons, Eugene G. Bersuker (born 1979) and Kirill G. Bersuker (born 1985), a molecular biologist.

== See also ==
- Jahn–Teller effect
- Pseudo Jahn–Teller effect
- Vibronic coupling
- Adiabatic theorem
- Born–Oppenheimer approximation
- Symmetry breaking
- Coordination Complex
- Ferroelectricity
- Perovskite
