= Renner–Teller effect =

The Renner-Teller effect is a phenomenon in molecular spectroscopy where a pair of electronic states that become degenerate at linearity are coupled by rovibrational motion.

The Renner-Teller effect is observed in the spectra of molecules that have electronic states that allow vibration through a linear configuration. For such molecules electronic states that are doubly degenerate at linearity (Π, Δ, ..., etc.) will split into two close-lying nondegenerate states for non-linear configurations. As part of the Renner–Teller effect, the rovibronic levels of such a pair of states will be strongly Coriolis coupled by the rotational kinetic energy operator causing a breakdown of the Born–Oppenheimer approximation. This is to be contrasted with the Jahn–Teller effect which occurs for polyatomic molecules in electronic states that allow vibration through a symmetric nonlinear configuration, where the electronic state is degenerate, and which further involves a breakdown of the Born-Oppenheimer approximation but here caused by the vibrational kinetic energy operator.

In its original formulation, the Renner–Teller effect was discussed for a triatomic molecule in an electronic state that is a linear Π-state at equilibrium. The 1934 article by Rudolf Renner was one of the first that considered dynamic effects that go beyond the Born–Oppenheimer approximation, in which the nuclear and electronic motions in a molecule are uncoupled. Renner chose an electronically excited state of the carbon dioxide molecule (CO_{2}) that is a linear Π-state at equilibrium for his studies. The products of purely electronic and purely nuclear rovibrational states served as the zeroth-order (no rovibronic coupling) wave functions in Renner's study. The rovibronic coupling acts as a perturbation.

Renner is the only author of the 1934 paper that first described the effect, so it can be called simply the Renner effect. Renner did this work as a PhD student under the supervision of Edward Teller and presumably Teller was perfectly happy not to be a coauthor. However, in 1933 Gerhard Herzberg and Teller had recognized that the potential of a triatomic linear molecule in a degenerate electronic state at linearity splits into two when the molecule is bent. A year later this effect was worked out in detail by Renner. Herzberg refers to this as the "Renner–Teller" effect in one of his influential books, and this name is most commonly used.

While Renner's theoretical study concerns an excited electronic state of carbon dioxide that is linear at equilibrium, the first observation of the Renner–Teller effect was in an electronic state of the NH_{2} molecule that is bent at equilibrium.

Much has been published about the Renner–Teller effect since its first experimental observation in 1959; see the bibliography on pages 412-413 of the textbook by Bunker and Jensen. Section 13.4 of this textbook discusses both the Renner–Teller effect (called the Renner effect) and the Jahn–Teller effect.

== See also ==
- Coriolis force § Molecular physics
