= Goldmark =

Goldmark can refer to:

== People ==
- Henry C. Goldmark (1857–1941), American engineer who designed and installed the Panama Canal locks
- Joseph Goldmark (1819–1881), Hungarian-American physician and chemist
- Josephine Clara Goldmark (1877–1950), American social activist
- Karl Goldmark (Goldmark Károly, 1830 –1915), Viennese composer
- Kathi Kamen Goldmark (1948–2012), American author, columnist, publishing consultant, radio and music producer, songwriter and musician
- Pauline Goldmark (1874–1962), American social reformer
- Peter Carl Goldmark (1906–1977), Hungarian-American engineer and inventor
- Peter Carl Goldmark, Jr. (born 1940), American publisher and journalist
- Peter J. Goldmark (born 1946), American rancher, geneticist and politician
- Rubin Goldmark (1872–1936), American composer, pianist, and educator

== Other ==
- German gold mark, coinage of the German Empire, 1871–1918
- Goldmark Jeweller, Australian jewellery retail chain
- GOLDMARK, a mnemonic for causes of high anion gap metabolic acidosis
- Murder of the Goldmark family
