= Zirconium diphosphide =

Identifiers
| 3D model (JSmol) | Interactive image |
- InChI: InChI=1S/2P.Zr Key: KOYGUUORAMWMAD-UHFFFAOYSA-N
- SMILES: [P].[P].[Zr]

Properties
| Chemical formula | P_{2}Zr |
| Molar mass | 153.172 g·mol^{−1} |
| Appearance | grey crystals |
| Solubility in water | insoluble |

Related compounds
| Related compounds | Zirconium monophosphide |
- Except where otherwise noted, data are given for materials in their standard state (at 25 °C [77 °F], 100 kPa). Infobox references

Zirconium diphosphide is a binary inorganic compound of zirconium metal and phosphorus with the chemical formula ZrP_{2}.

== Preparation ==
Zirconium diphosphide can be obtained from arc-melting of zirconium with red phosphorus:

2 Zr + P_{4} → 2 ZrP_{2}

== Physical properties ==
Zirconium diphosphide forms grey crystals that is insoluble in water. Zirconium diphosphide is very toxic. Has a lead(II) chloride crystal structure. It dissolves in warm concentrated sulfuric acid. It decomposes into phosphorus and ZrP when heated in vacuum:

ZrP_{2} → ZrP + P
