= Neptunium phosphide =

Neptunium phosphide may refer to:

- Neptunium(III) phosphide (neptunium monophosphide), NpP
- Neptunium(IV) phosphide (trineptunium tetraphosphide), Np_{3}P_{4}
