= Hafnium phosphide =

Names
- IUPAC name Phosphanylidynehafnium
- Other names: Hafnium monophosphide

Identifiers
CAS Number	12325-59-6
3D model (JSmol)	Interactive image
ChemSpider	80564726
ECHA InfoCard	100.032.343
EC Number	235-591-6
- InChI: InChI=1/Hf.P/rHfP/c1-2 Key: TUDWSEQKKUSFNR-UHFFFAOYSA-N
- SMILES: [Hf]#P

Properties
Chemical formula	HfP
Molar mass	209.464 g/mol
Appearance	Crystalline solid
Density	9.78 g/cm^{3}
log P	0.30

Structure
Molecular shape	Hexagonal

Related compounds
Related compounds	Hafnium(III) phosphide
- Except where otherwise noted, data are given for materials in their standard state (at 25 °C [77 °F], 100 kPa). Infobox references

Hafnium phosphide (HfP) is a binary inorganic compound of hafnium metal and phosphorus.

== Preparation ==
It can be obtained by heating together hafnium powder and red phosphorus in sealed quartz tube under vacuum at high temperatures.

== Uses ==
The compound is a semiconductor used in high power, high frequency applications and in laser diodes.

Silica-supported hafnium phosphide (HfP/SiO_{2}) was used as a solid acid catalyst to drive furfural production from xylan.
