= Tomanek =

Tomanek is a surname. Notable people by that name include:

- Rudolf Tomanek (1879–1941), Polish Roman Catholic priest, liturgist
- Joseph Tomanek (1889–1974), Czech-American artist
- Dick Tomanek (1931–2023), American former professional baseball player
- Jan Tománek (born 1978), Czech filmmaker
- Jan Tománek (born 1972), Czech rally co-driver
- David Tománek (born 1954), Czech-Swiss-American physicist
