= Bennemann =

Bennemann is a German surname. Notable people with the surname include:

- Eva Bennemann (born 2007) German tennis player
- Helmut Bennemann (1915–2007), German fighter pilot
- Karl Heinz Bennemann (born 1932), German physicist
