= Lead heptaphosphide =

Chemical compound

Identifiers
CAS Number	1620125-10-1
3D model (JSmol)	Interactive image
- InChI: InChI=1S/P7.Pb/c1-7-5-3-2-4-6-7;/q-2;+2 Key: PYNHPNWNMKXJRJ-UHFFFAOYSA-N
- SMILES: [Pb+2].[P-2][P]1[P][P][P][P][P]1

Properties
Chemical formula	PbP_{7}
Molar mass	424.03
Appearance	black solid
- Except where otherwise noted, data are given for materials in their standard state (at 25 °C [77 °F], 100 kPa). Infobox references

Lead heptaphosphide is the only binary phosphide currently known to be formed by lead and phosphorus. The chemical formula is PbP_{7}, which contains [P_{7}]^{2−} atom clusters. This compound is stable in the air.

== Preparation ==
Lead heptaphosphide can be produced by the reaction of red phosphorus and lead:

7 P_{4} + 4 Pb → 4 PbP_{7}

It decomposes again into the elements at 550 K (277 °C).

== Properties ==
Lead heptaphosphide crystallises in the monoclinic crystal system, with space group P2_{1}/c, a=970.70(11), b=673.34(10), c=1243.89(18) pm and β=122.55(1)°. Each phosphorus atom in the phosphorus cluster is connected to the other six.
