= Neptunium(IV) phosphide =

Identifiers
| CAS Number | 111117-76-1 |
| 3D model (JSmol) | Interactive image |
- InChI: InChI=1S/3Np.4P Key: BLKYGPPFNRPFDX-UHFFFAOYSA-N
- SMILES: [Np].[Np].[Np].[P].[P].[P].[P]

Properties
| Chemical formula | Np_{3}P_{4} |
| Molar mass | 835 g·mol^{−1} |
| Appearance | black crystals |
| Solubility in water | insoluble |

Related compounds
| Related compounds | Neptunium(III) phosphide |
- Except where otherwise noted, data are given for materials in their standard state (at 25 °C [77 °F], 100 kPa). Infobox references

Neptunium(IV) phosphide is a binary inorganic compound of neptunium metal and phosphorus with the chemical formula Np_{3}P_{4}.

== Preparation ==
Neptunium(IV) phosphide can be formed from the fusion of stoichiometric amounts of neptunium and red phosphorus in an evacuated and sealed quartz tube at 750 °C:

3Np + 4P → Np_{3}P_{4}

== Physical properties ==
Neptunium(IV) phosphide forms black crystals of cubic crystal system, spatial group I 43d. Isostructural with Th_{3}P_{4}.

It does not dissolve in water.

== Chemical properties ==
The compound reacts with concentrated HCl to give a green solution:

Np_{3}P_{4} + 12HCl → 3NpCl_{4} + 4PH_{3}
