= Anton Schrötter von Kristelli =

Austrian chemist (1802–1875)

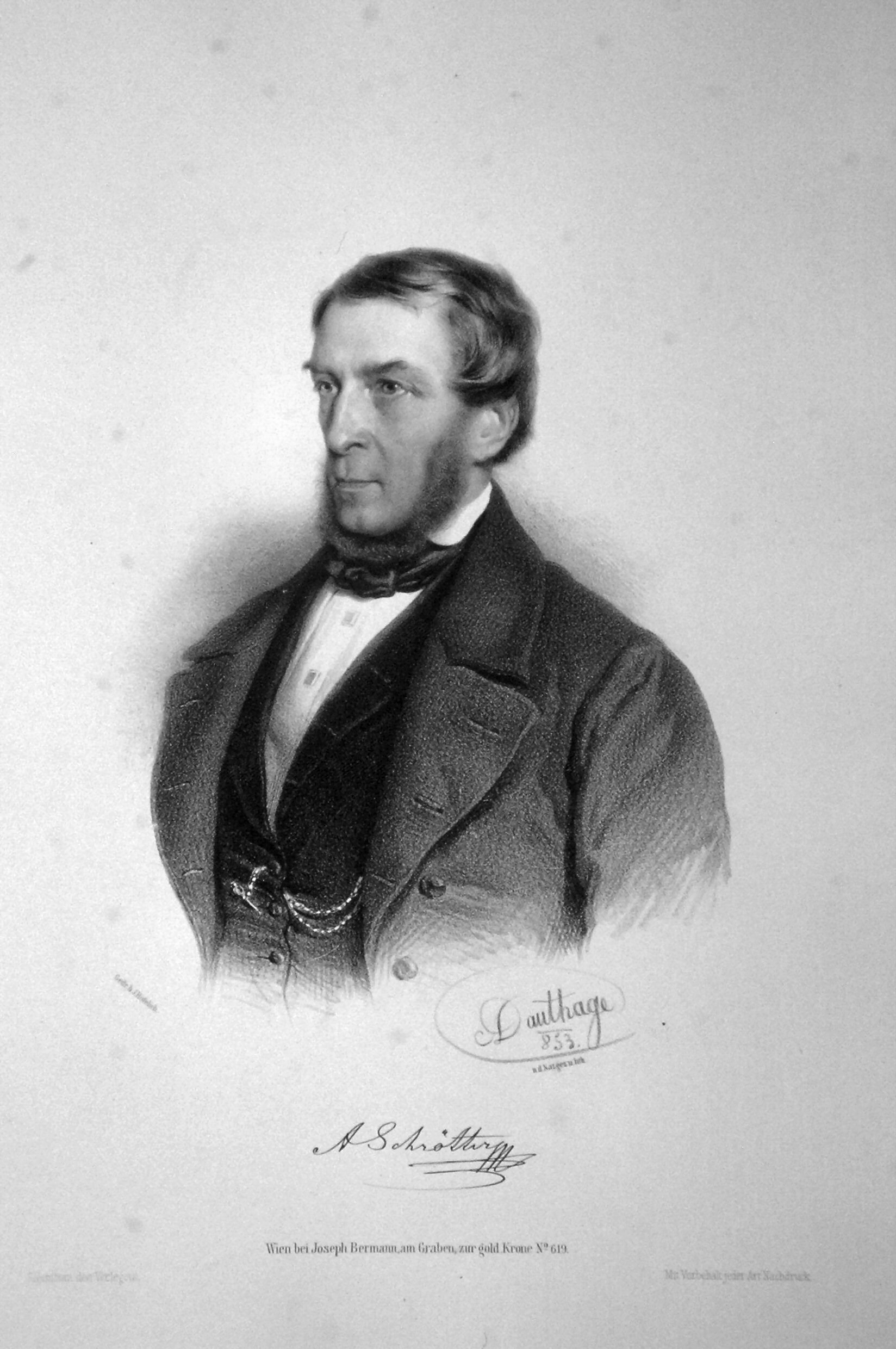
- Schrötter von Kristelli, 1853 lithograph
- Born: 26 November 1802; Olomouc, Moravia, Habsburg monarchy
- Died: 15 April 1875 (aged 72)
- Education: University of Vienna
- Scientific career
- Fields: Chemistry, mineralogy
- Workplaces: University of Vienna
- Academic advisors: Friedrich Mohs; Andreas von Ettingshausen
- Notable students: Joseph Goldmark

Anton Schrötter von Kristelli (26 November 1802 – 15 April 1875) was an Austrian chemist and mineralogist. His son Leopold Schrötter Ritter von Kristelli (1837–1908) was a noted laryngologist.

== Life and academic background ==
He was born on 26 November 1802 in Olomouc in Moravia. Anton's father was an apothecary. He initially studied medicine in Vienna at the request of his father, but switched to the natural sciences under the influence of Friedrich Mohs (1773–1839). In 1827 he became an assistant to mathematician Andreas von Ettingshausen (1796–1878) and to physicist Andreas von Baumgartner (1793–1865) at the University of Vienna. Three years later he was appointed professor of physics and chemistry at the Joanneum Technical Institute in Graz, and from 1843 served as a professor of technical chemistry at the Polytechnic Institute in Vienna. In 1845 he succeeded Paul Traugott Meissner (1778–1864) as chair of chemistry. In 1868 he was appointed Master of the Austrian State Mint (Münze Österreich). Declining health made him retire in 1874.

== Contributions ==
As a chemist he conducted research involving reactions of metals with ammonia at higher temperatures, and performed investigations of substances such as amber, idrialite, ozokerite, asphalt and dopplerite. He also investigated the reactive behavior of potassium in liquid nitrous oxide, of phosphorus and antimony in liquid chlorine, and of iron towards oxygen at very low temperatures. In 1845 he discovered a process for preparing red phosphorus, a development which led to the invention of the safety match.

He was a scientific consultant to the Novara Expedition (1857–1859), as well as to the Austro-Hungarian North Pole Expedition. His name is associated with the Schrötterhorn of the Ortlergruppe in the Alps and "Cape Schrötter" on Franz Josef Land.

With Ettingshausen, Baumgartner and Wilhelm von Haidinger (1795–1871), he was a founding member of the Austrian Academy of Sciences, serving as its secretary from 1851 until his death. Since 1876, the Schröttergasse in the Favoriten district of Vienna has been named in his honor.

== Selected writings ==
- Die Chemie nach ihrem gegenwärtigen Zustand (1847–1849); two volumes.
- Beschreibung eines Verfahrens zur fabrikmäßigen Darstellung des amorphen Phosphors (Description of a method for factory representation of amorphous phosphorus), (1848)
- Ueber einen neuen allotropischen Zustand des Phosphors (About a new allotropic state of phosphorus), (1849)
- Ueber das Vorkommen des Ozons im Mineralreich (About the presence of ozone in the mineral kingdom), (1860)
