= Allotropes of phosphorus =

Solid forms of the element phosphorus

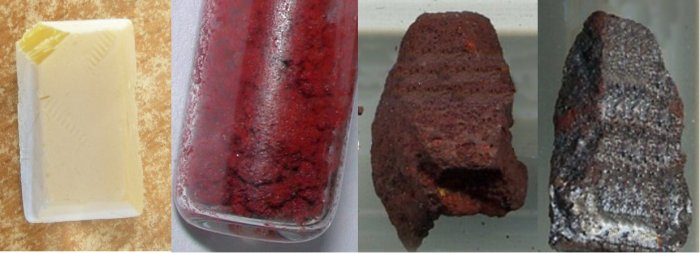
White phosphorus (left), red phosphorus (center left and center right), and violet phosphorus (right)

White phosphorus and resulting allotropes

Elemental phosphorus can exist in several allotropes, the most common of which are white and red solids. Solid violet and black allotropes are also known. Gaseous phosphorus exists as diphosphorus and atomic phosphorus.

== White phosphorus ==
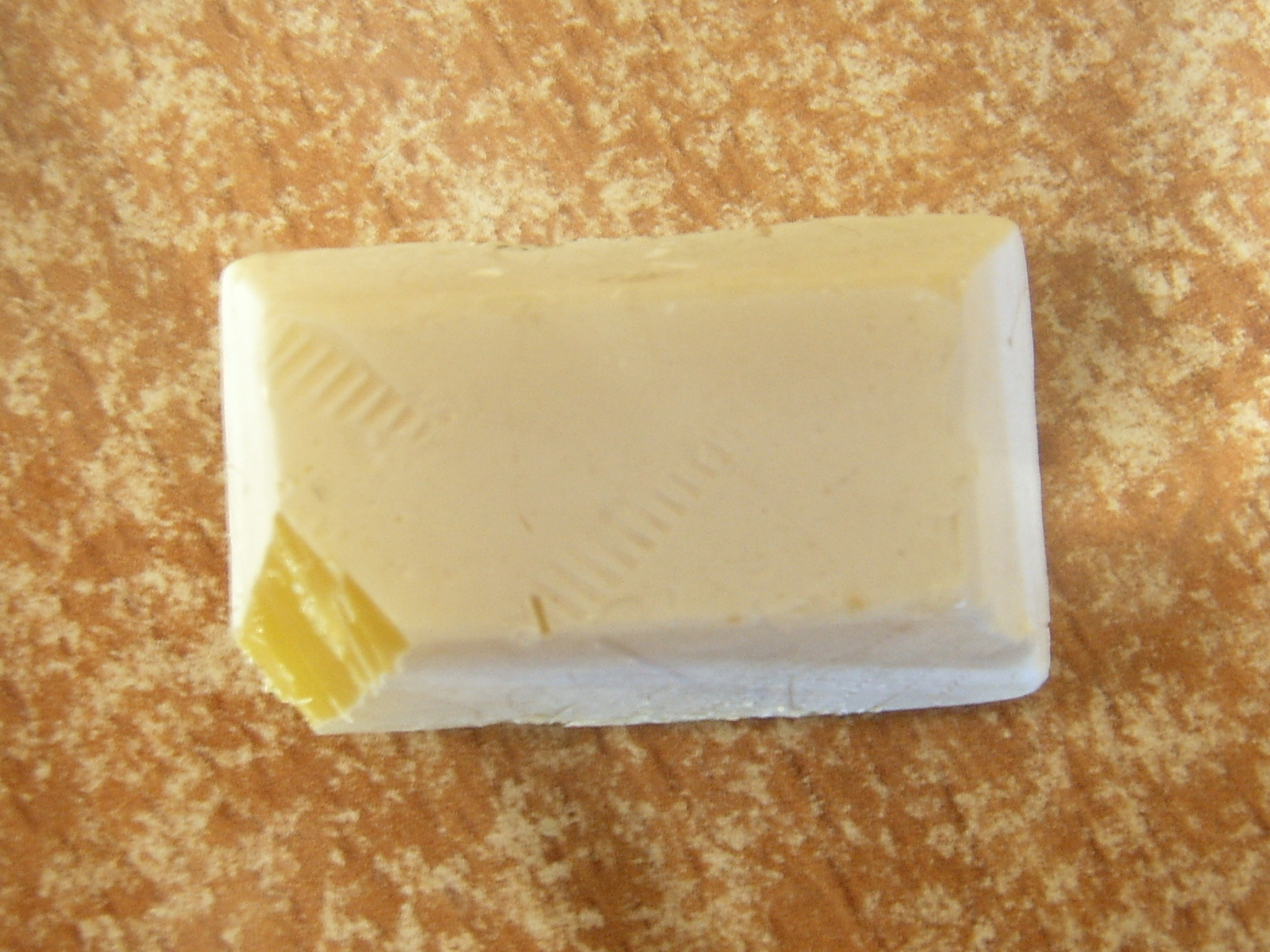
White phosphorus sample with a chunk removed from the corner to expose un-oxidized material

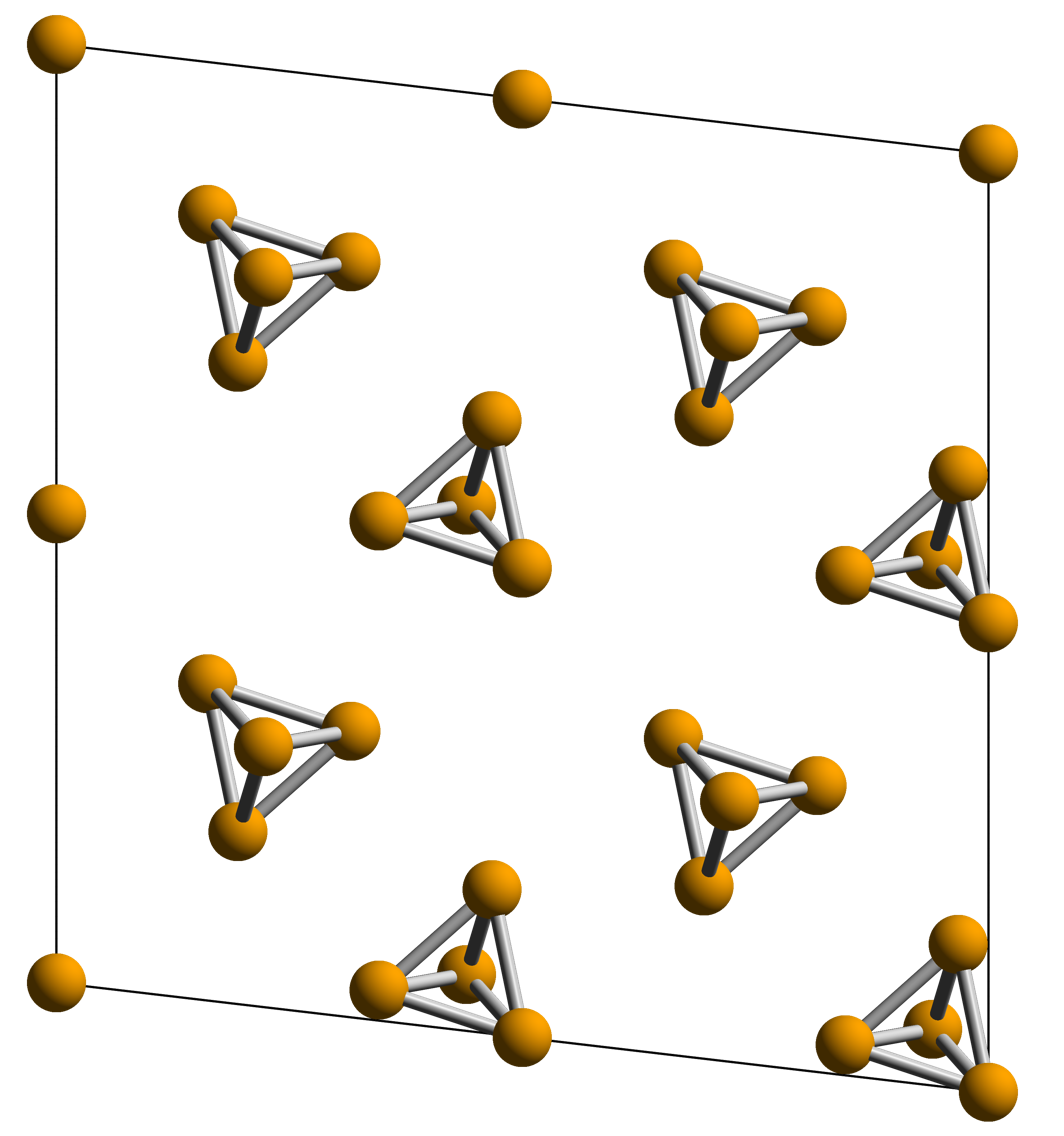
White phosphorus crystal structure

White phosphorus, yellow phosphorus or simply tetraphosphorus (P_{4}) exists as molecules of four phosphorus atoms in a tetrahedral structure, joined by six phosphorus—phosphorus single bonds. The free P_{4} molecule in the gas phase has a P-P bond length of r_{g} = 2.1994(3) Å as was determined by gas electron diffraction. Despite the tetrahedral arrangement the P_{4} molecules have no significant ring strain and a vapor of P_{4} molecules is stable. This is due to the nature of bonding in the P_{4} tetrahedron which can be described by spherical aromaticity or cluster bonding, that is the electrons are highly delocalized. This has been illustrated by calculations of the magnetically induced currents, which sum up to 29 nA/T, much more than in the archetypical aromatic molecule benzene (11 nA/T).

Molten and gaseous white phosphorus also retains the tetrahedral molecules, until 800 °C (1,500 °F; 1,100 K) when it starts decomposing to P_{2} molecules.

White phosphorus is a translucent waxy solid that quickly yellows in light, and impure white phosphorus is for this reason called yellow phosphorus. It is toxic, causing severe liver damage on ingestion and phossy jaw from chronic ingestion or inhalation.

It glows greenish in the dark (when exposed to oxygen). It ignites spontaneously in air at about 50 °C (122 °F), and at much lower temperatures if finely divided (due to melting-point depression). Because of this property, white phosphorus is used as a weapon. Phosphorus reacts with oxygen, usually forming two oxides depending on the amount of available oxygen: P_{4}O_{6} (phosphorus trioxide) when reacted with a limited supply of oxygen, and P_{4}O_{10} when reacted with excess oxygen. On rare occasions, P_{4}O_{7}, P_{4}O_{8}, and P_{4}O_{9} are also formed, but in small amounts. This combustion gives phosphorus(V) oxide, which consists of P_{4}O_{10} tetrahedral with oxygen inserted between the phosphorus atoms and at their vertices:

P_{4} + 5 O_{2} → P_{4}O_{10}

The odour of combustion of this form has a characteristic garlic smell. White phosphorus is only slightly soluble in water and can be stored under water. Indeed, white phosphorus is safe from self-igniting when it is submerged in water; due to this, unreacted white phosphorus can prove hazardous to beachcombers who may collect washed-up samples while unaware of their true nature. P_{4} is soluble in benzene, oils, carbon disulfide, and disulfur dichloride.

The white allotrope can be produced using several methods. In the industrial process, phosphate rock is heated in an electric or fuel-fired furnace in the presence of carbon and silica. Elemental phosphorus is then liberated as a vapour and can be collected under phosphoric acid. An idealized equation for this carbothermal reaction is shown for calcium phosphate (although phosphate rock contains substantial amounts of fluoroapatite):

2 Ca_{3}(PO_{4})_{2} + 6 SiO_{2} + 10 C → 6 CaSiO_{3} + 10 CO + P_{4}

=== Other polyhedrane analogues ===
Although white phosphorus forms the tetrahedron, the simplest possible Platonic hydrocarbon, no other polyhedral phosphorus clusters are known. White phosphorus converts to the thermodynamically-stabler red allotrope, but that allotrope is not isolated polyhedra.

Cubane, in particular, is unlikely to form, and the closest approach is the half-phosphorus compound P_{4}(CH)_{4}, produced from phosphaalkynes. Other clusters are more thermodynamically favorable, and some have been partially formed as components of larger polyelemental compounds.

== Red phosphorus ==
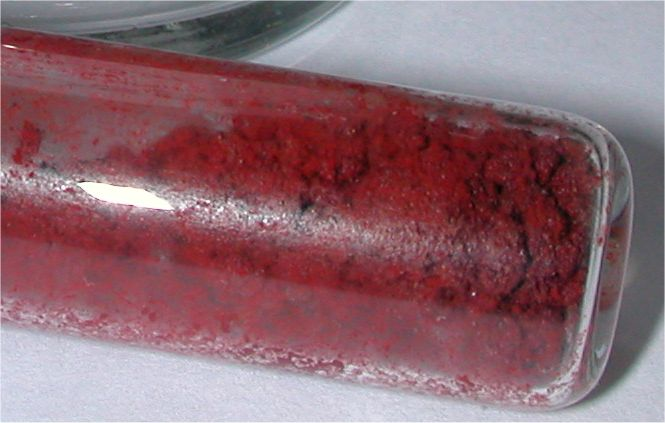
Red phosphorus

Red phosphorus may be formed by heating white phosphorus to 300 °C (570 °F) in the absence of air or by exposing white phosphorus to sunlight. Red phosphorus exists as an amorphous network. Upon further heating, the amorphous red phosphorus crystallizes. It has two crystalline forms: violet phosphorus and fibrous red phosphorus. Bulk red phosphorus does not ignite in air at temperatures below 240 °C (460 °F), whereas pieces of white phosphorus ignite at about 30 °C (86 °F).

Under standard conditions it is more stable than white phosphorus, but less stable than the thermodynamically stable black phosphorus. The standard enthalpy of formation of red phosphorus is −17.6 kJ/mol. Red phosphorus is kinetically most stable.

It was first presented by Anton von Schrötter before the Vienna Academy of Sciences on December 9, 1847, although others had doubtlessly had this substance in their hands before, such as Berzelius.

== Violet or Hittorf's phosphorus ==
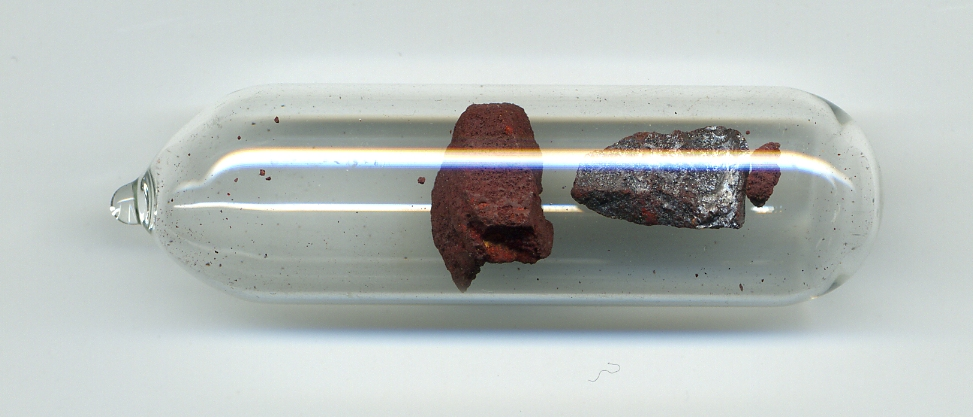
Violet phosphorus (right) by a sample of red phosphorus (left)

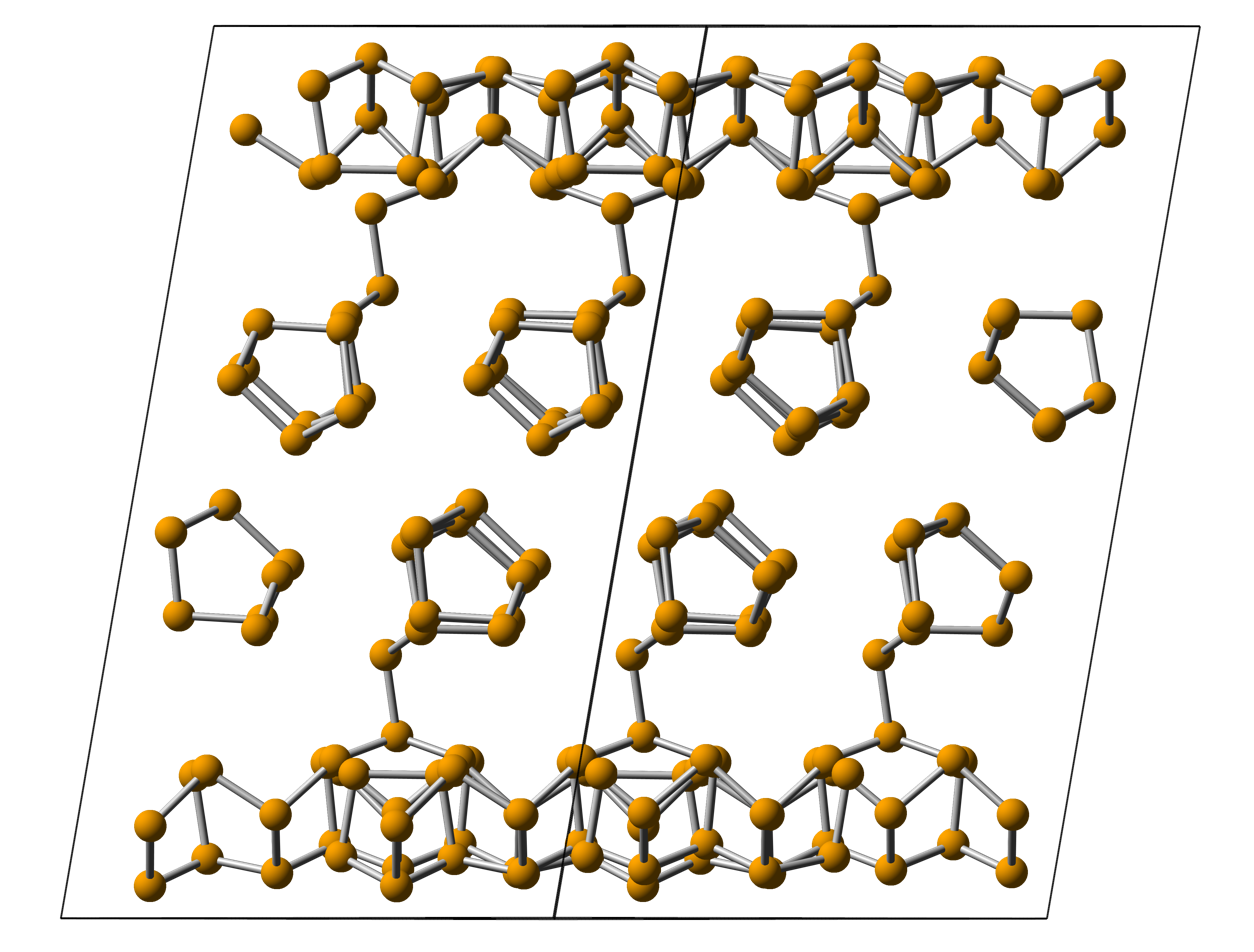
Hittorf's phosphorus structure

Monoclinic phosphorus, violet phosphorus, or Hittorf's metallic phosphorus is a crystalline form of the amorphous red phosphorus. In 1865, Johann Wilhelm Hittorf heated red phosphorus in a sealed tube at 530 °C. The upper part of the tube was kept at 444 °C. Brilliant opaque monoclinic, or rhombohedral, crystals sublimed as a result. Violet phosphorus can also be prepared by dissolving white phosphorus in molten lead in a sealed tube at 500 °C for 18 hours. Upon slow cooling, Hittorf's allotrope crystallises out. The crystals can be revealed by dissolving the lead in dilute nitric acid followed by boiling in concentrated hydrochloric acid. In addition, a fibrous form exists with similar phosphorus cages. The lattice structure of violet phosphorus was presented by Thurn and Krebs in 1969. Imaginary frequencies, indicating the irrationalities or instabilities of the structure, were obtained for the reported violet structure from 1969. The single crystal of violet phosphorus was also produced. The lattice structure of violet phosphorus has been obtained by single-crystal x-ray diffraction to be monoclinic with space group of P2/n (13) (a = 9.210, b = 9.128, c = 21.893 Å, β = 97.776°, CSD-1935087). The optical band gap of the violet phosphorus was measured by diffuse reflectance spectroscopy to be around 1.7 eV. The thermal decomposition temperature was 52 °C higher than its black phosphorus counterpart. The violet phosphorene was easily obtained from both mechanical and solution exfoliation.

=== Reactions of violet phosphorus ===
Violet phosphorus does not ignite in air until heated to 300 °C and is insoluble in all solvents. It is not attacked by alkali and only slowly reacts with halogens. It can be oxidised by nitric acid to phosphoric acid. Violet phosphorus ignites upon impact in air.

If it is heated in an atmosphere of inert gas, for example nitrogen or carbon dioxide, it sublimes and the vapour condenses as white phosphorus. If it is heated in a vacuum and the vapour condensed rapidly, violet phosphorus is obtained. It would appear that violet phosphorus is a polymer of high relative molecular mass, which on heating breaks down into P_{2} molecules. On cooling, these would normally dimerize to give P_{4} molecules (i.e. white phosphorus) but, in a vacuum, they link up again to form the polymeric violet allotrope.

== Black phosphorus ==
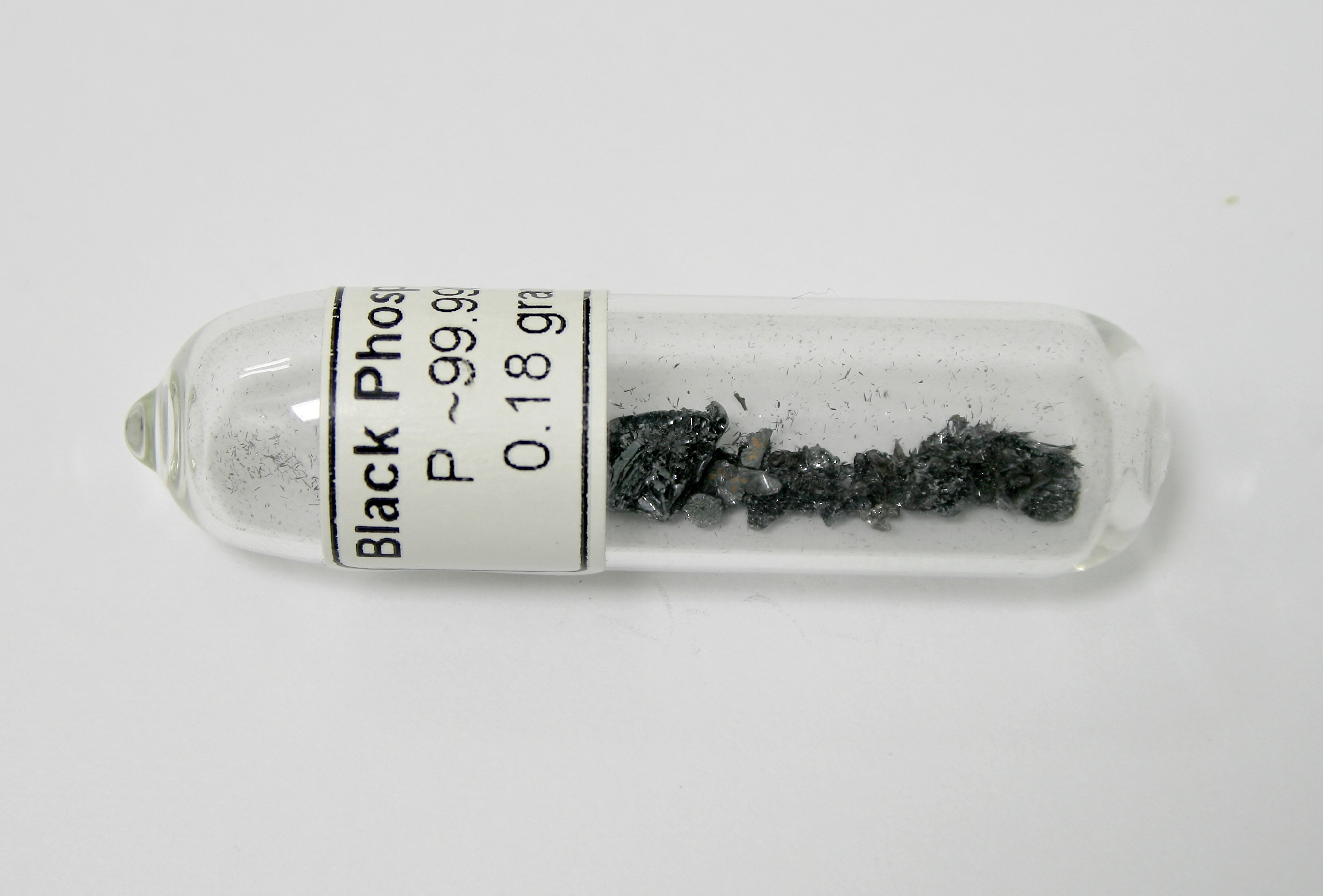
Black phosphorus ampoule

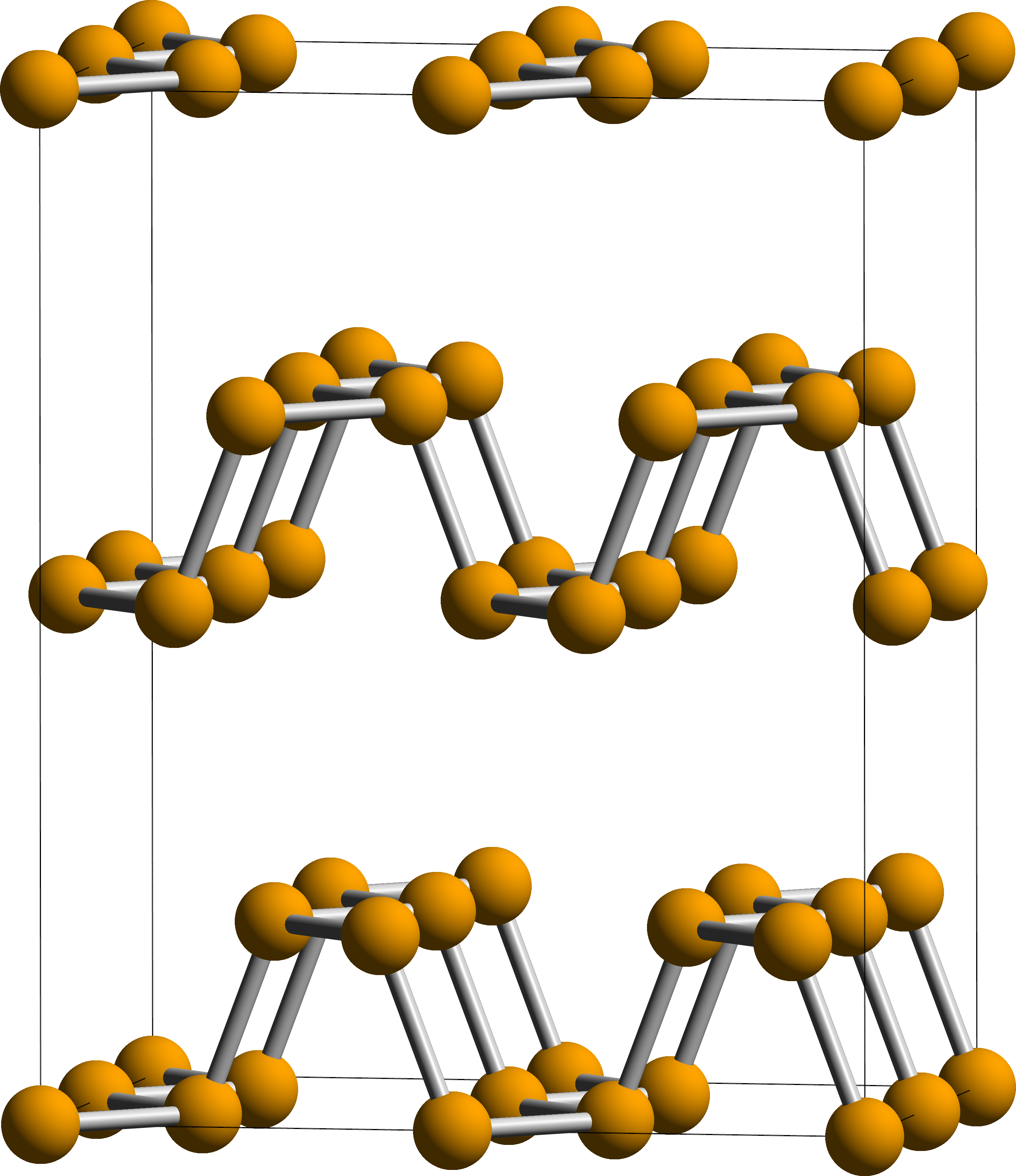
Black phosphorus

Black phosphorus structure

Black phosphorus is the thermodynamically stable form of phosphorus at room temperature and pressure, with a heat of formation of −39.3 kJ/mol (relative to white phosphorus which is defined as the standard state). It was first synthesized by heating white phosphorus under high pressures (12,000 atmospheres) in 1914. As a 2D material, in appearance, properties, and structure, black phosphorus is very much like graphite with both being black and flaky, a conductor of electricity, and having puckered sheets of linked atoms.

Black phosphorus has an orthorhombic pleated honeycomb structure and is the least reactive allotrope, a result of its lattice of interlinked six-membered rings where each atom is bonded to three other atoms. In this structure, each phosphorus atom has five outer shell electrons. Black and red phosphorus can also take a cubic crystal lattice structure. The first high-pressure synthesis of black phosphorus crystals was made by the Nobel prize winner Percy Williams Bridgman in 1914. Metal salts catalyze the synthesis of black phosphorus.

Black phosphorus-based sensors exhibit several superior qualities over traditional materials used in piezoelectric or resistive sensors. Characterized by its unique puckered honeycomb lattice structure, black phosphorus provides exceptional carrier mobility. This property ensures its high sensitivity and mechanical resilience, making it an intriguing candidate for sensor technology.

=== Phosphorene ===
The similarities to graphite also include the possibility of scotch-tape delamination (exfoliation), resulting in phosphorene, a graphene-like 2D material with excellent charge transport properties, thermal transport properties and optical properties. Distinguishing features of scientific interest include a thickness dependent band-gap, which is not found in graphene. This, combined with a high on/off ratio of ~10^{5} makes phosphorene a promising candidate for field-effect transistors (FETs). The tunable bandgap also suggests promising applications in mid-infrared photodetectors and LEDs. Exfoliated black phosphorus sublimes at 400 °C in vacuum. It gradually oxidizes when exposed to water in the presence of oxygen, which is a concern when contemplating it as a material for the manufacture of transistors, for example. Exfoliated black phosphorus is an emerging anode material in the battery community, showing high stability and lithium storage.

== Ring-shaped phosphorus ==
Ring-shaped phosphorus was theoretically predicted in 2007. The ring-shaped phosphorus was self-assembled inside evacuated multi-walled carbon nanotubes with inner diameters of 5–8 nm using a vapor encapsulation method. A ring with a diameter of 5.30 nm, consisting of 23 P_{8} and 23 P_{2} units with a total of 230 P atoms, was observed inside a multi-walled carbon nanotube with an inner diameter of 5.90 nm in atomic scale. The distance between neighboring rings is 6.4 Å.

The P_{6} ring shaped molecule is not stable in isolation.

== Blue phosphorus ==
Single-layer blue phosphorus was first produced in 2016 by the method of molecular beam epitaxy from black phosphorus as precursor.

== Diphosphorus ==
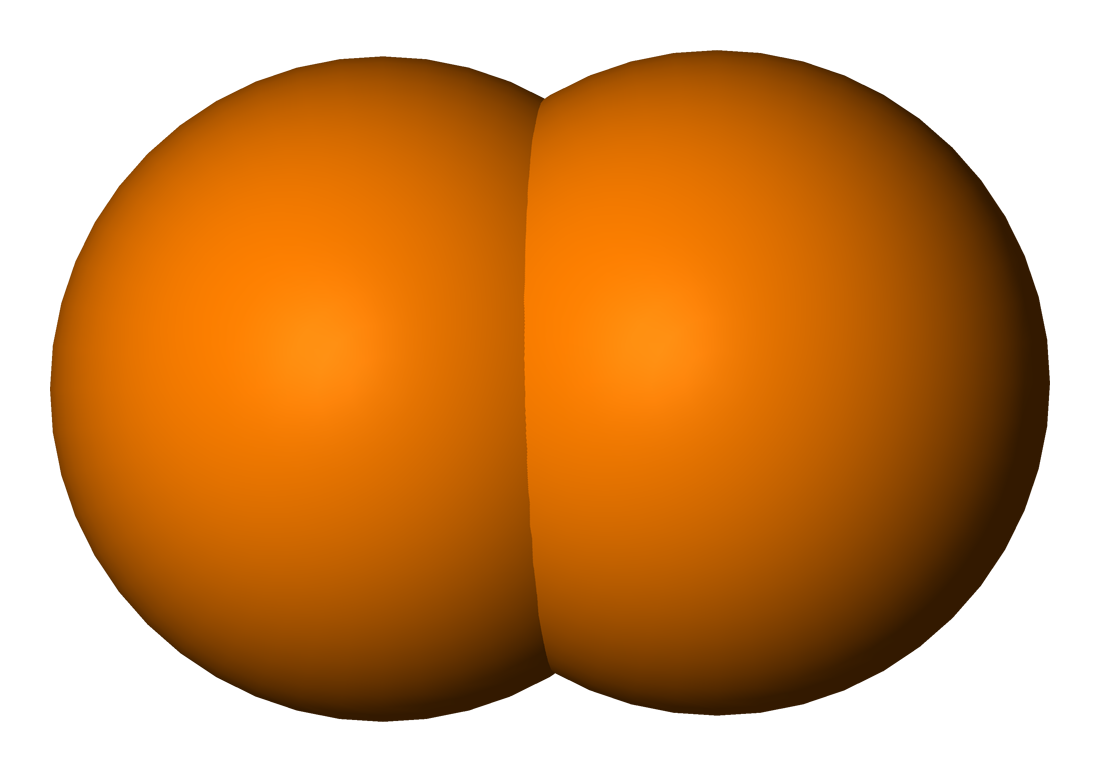
Structure of diphosphorus

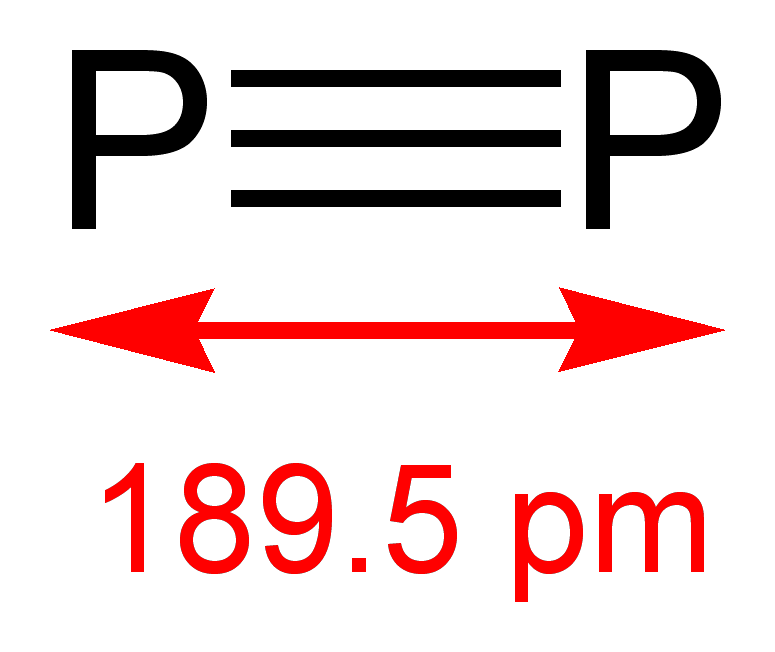
Diphosphorus molecule

The diphosphorus allotrope (P_{2}) can normally be obtained only under extreme conditions (for example, from P_{4} at 1100 kelvin). In 2006, the diatomic molecule was generated in homogeneous solution under normal conditions with the use of transition metal complexes (for example, tungsten and niobium).

Diphosphorus is the gaseous form of phosphorus, and the thermodynamically stable form between 1200 °C and 2000 °C. The dissociation of tetraphosphorus (P_{4}) begins at lower temperature: the percentage of P_{2} at 800 °C is ≈ 1%. At temperatures above about 2000 °C, the diphosphorus molecule begins to dissociate into atomic phosphorus.

== Phosphorus nanorods ==
P_{12} nanorod polymers were isolated from CuI-P complexes using low temperature treatment.

Red/brown phosphorus was shown to be stable in air for several weeks and have properties distinct from those of red phosphorus. Electron microscopy showed that red/brown phosphorus forms long, parallel nanorods with a diameter between 3.4 Å and 4.7 Å.

== Properties ==
Properties of some allotropes of phosphorus
Form	white(α)	white(β)	violet	black
Symmetry	Body-centred cubic	Triclinic	Monoclinic	Orthorhombic
Pearson symbol		aP24	mP84	oS8
Space group	I4̅3m	P1̅ No. 2	P2/c No. 13	Cmca No. 64
Density (g/cm^{3})	1.828	1.88	2.36	2.69
Band gap (eV)	2.1		1.5	0.34
Refractive index	1.8244		2.6	2.4
