= David Tománek =

American-Swiss physicist (born 1954)

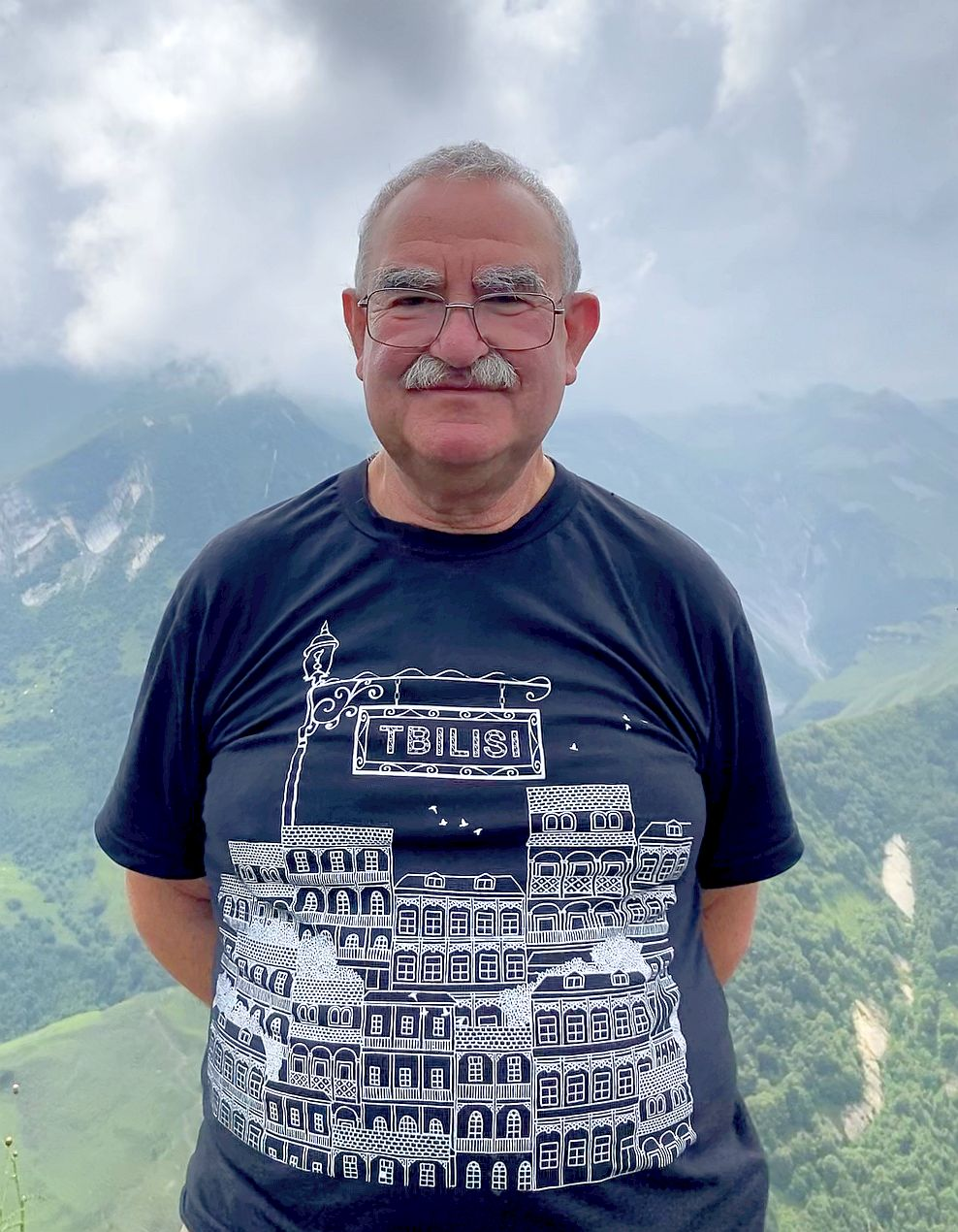
- Born: July 1954 (age 72); Prague
- Citizenship: United States, Switzerland
- Occupation: Professor of Physics
- Known for: Nanotechnology

Academic background
- Education: Freie Universität Berlin
- Doctoral advisor: Karl Heinz Bennemann
- Other advisors: Michael A. Schlüter, Steven G. Louie

Academic work
- Discipline: theoretical physics
- Sub-discipline: condensed matter physics, atomic clusters, carbon nanotubes, phosphorene
- Institutions: Freie Universität Berlin, Bell Labs, University of California, Berkeley, Michigan State University
- Website: https://nanoten.com/tomanek/

David Tománek (born July 1954) is a U.S.-Swiss physicist of Czech origin and researcher in nanoscience and nanotechnology. He is Emeritus Professor of Physics at Michigan State University. He is known for predicting the structure and calculating properties of surfaces, atomic clusters including the C_{60} buckminsterfullerene, nanotubes, nanowires and nanohelices, graphene, and two-dimensional materials including phosphorene.

== Academic career ==
Tománek earned a doctoral degree in Physics from the Freie Universität Berlin in 1983 under the supervision of Karl Heinz Bennemann and became Hochschulassistent there in 1984. Between 1985 and 1987 he worked as postdoctoral researcher at the Bell Labs under the supervision of Michael A. Schlüter and at the University of California, Berkeley under the supervision of Steven G. Louie. Since 1987, he has been Professor of Physics at Michigan State University, where he directs the Computational Nanotechnology Laboratory at the Department of Physics and Astronomy.

== Research ==
Tománek and his research group have worked in areas in nanoscience and nanotechnology. As a graduate student at FU Berlin, he studied structural end electronic properties of surfaces, including reconstruction and photoemission spectra. He was intrigued by the unusual structure and electronic properties of atomic clusters, including collective electronic excitations and superconductivity. His computational studies of growth regimes of silicon and carbon clusters have made use of the semi-quantitative Linear Combination of Atomic Orbitals (LCAO) or tight-binding method.

During his 1994 sabbatical stay at the laboratory of Richard E. Smalley, he turned his interest to the unique properties of nanotubes formed of carbon (CNTs) and other materials. He studied their morphology, formation, mechanical stiffness, their ability to conduct heat and electrons, and field electron emission.

After 2000, he got involved in studies of two-dimensional materials including phosphorene. In the following years, he has continued identifying applications of carbon nanotubes and two-dimensional materials in fields including low-resistance contacts to nanostructures, nanomechanical energy storage, and purification and desalination of water.

== Conferences ==
Tománek initiated a series of annual Nanotube (NT) conferences and a Gordon Research Conference on Two-dimensional electronics beyond graphene.

== Honors and awards ==
In 2004 Tománek was elected a Fellow of the American Physical Society and in 2005 he received the prestigious Alexander-von-Humboldt Senior Scientist Award (Germany). In 2008 he received the Japan Carbon Award for Life-Time Achievement and was chosen by the American Physical Society as member of the Outstanding Referees Program for excellence in peer review. In 2016 he received the Lee Hsun Research Award for Materials Science from the Chinese Academy of Sciences. His h-index is currently 85.
