= Zirconium monophosphide =

Zirconium phosphide
Names
- IUPAC name Phosphinidinzirconium

Identifiers
| CAS Number | 12037-72-8 |
| 3D model (JSmol) | Interactive image |
| ChemSpider | 74772 |
| EC Number | 234-866-8 |
| PubChem CID | 82860 |
| CompTox Dashboard (EPA) | DTXSID0065197 |
- InChI: InChI=1S/P.Zr Key: VQYKQHDWCVUGBB-UHFFFAOYSA-N
- SMILES: P#[Zr]

Properties
| Chemical formula | PZr |
| Molar mass | 122.198 g·mol^{−1} |
| Appearance | solid |

Hazards
- GHS labelling
| Pictograms | (GHS09: Environmental hazard) (GHS05: Corrosive) (GHS06: Toxic) |
- Except where otherwise noted, data are given for materials in their standard state (at 25 °C [77 °F], 100 kPa). Infobox references

Zirconium monophosphide is a binary inorganic compound of zirconium metal and phosphorus with the chemical formula ZrP.

== Preparation ==
Zirconium monophosphide can be prepared from direct reaction of zirconium powders with red phosphorus:

4 Zr + P_{4} → 4 ZrP

== Physical properties ==
The α-form of zirconium monophosphide has a NaCl crystal structure. The β-form structure is hexagonal. The α-form is a superconductor if cooled below 5K.
