= Joseph Goldmark =

Hungarian-American physician and chemist (1819–1881)

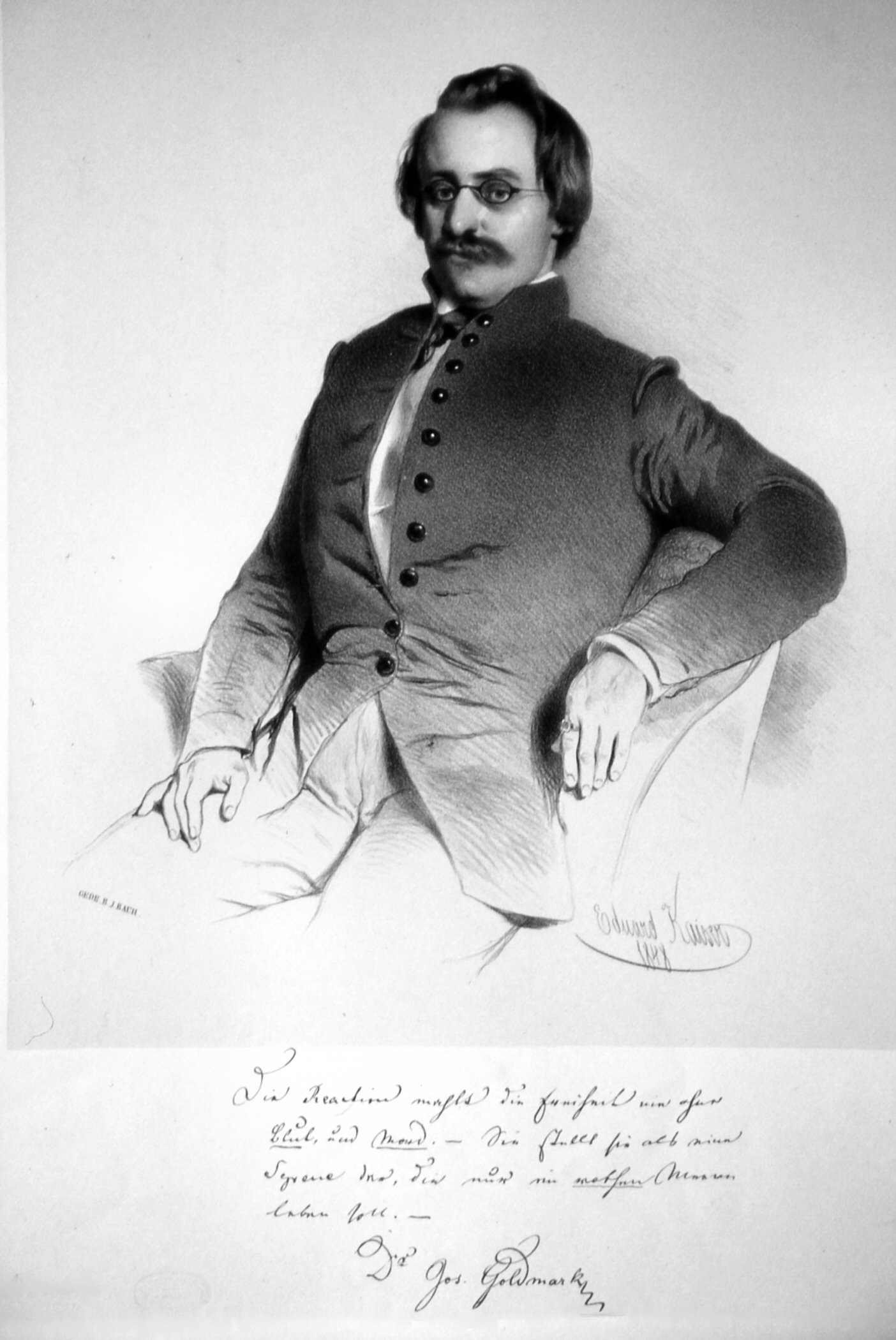
- Joseph Goldmark. Lithograph by Eduard Kaiser, 1848
- Born: Joseph Jacob Goldmark; 15 August 1819; Németkeresztúr, Austrian Empire
- Died: 18 April 1881 (aged 61); Brooklyn, New York, U.S.
- Education: University of Vienna
- Known for: Discovery of red phosphorus
- Spouse: Regina Wehle (m. 1856)
- Children: Helen Goldmark; Pauline Goldmark; Alice Goldmark; Josephine Goldmark (1871–1950)
- Scientific career
- Fields: Medicine, chemistry
- Academic advisors: Anton Schrötter von Kristelli

Joseph Jacob Goldmark (15 August 1819 – 18 April 1881) was a Hungarian American medical doctor and chemist, credited with the discovery of red phosphorus.

== Life and career ==
Born in Németkeresztúr, Austrian Empire to a Jewish family of 18 children, Goldmark entered the University of Vienna at age 16, studying medicine.

He developed an interest in chemistry under the influence of Anton Schrötter von Kristelli. Both are credited with the discovery of red phosphorus, which Goldmark presented to the Convention of Hungarian Physicians and Naturalists.

A revolutionist in his youth, Goldmark took part as a leader in the Revolution of 1848, along with Adolf Fischhof, fighting for Jewish emancipation.

When the revolution was stamped down, Goldmark was sentenced to death but managed to escape to the United States and settle in New York City. In America he married Regina Wehle, one of whose sisters, Bertha, married Elkan Naumburg in the same city.

While developing the Brooklyn factory of Goldmark and Conried, he continued to be active in politics during the rest of his life. He amassed a great deal of property to leave to his large family, which included daughters Helen (wife of Felix Adler), Pauline, and Alice (wife of Louis Brandeis), and Josephine.

Goldmark's brother Karl Goldmark was a composer and music teacher in Vienna.
