= Karl Heinz Bennemann =

German physicist

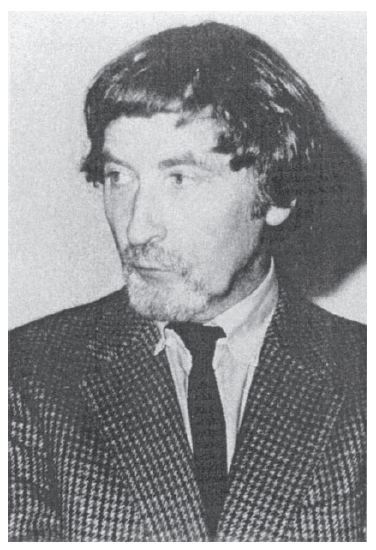
- Professor Karl Heinz Bennemann
- Born: July 31, 1932
- Education: University of Illinois Urbana-Champaign
- Scientific career
- Fields: Condensed matter physics
- Workplaces: Free University of Berlin

Karl Heinz Bennemann (born July 31, 1932) is a German condensed matter physicist. He has contributed to the advance on the understanding of traditional BCS and high Tc superconductors, the magnetic properties of alloys, the magnetic properties of low dimensional systems, the physicochemical properties of surfaces, the physicochemical properties of nanostructured materials, ultrafast phenomena, and non-linear optics, among others. His work was recognized through an Alfred P. Sloan fellowship in 1969.

== Career ==
Bennemann performed his Diploma and Doctor Rerum Naturalium studies in physics at the University of Münster. The diploma degree was obtained in 1960 under the supervision of Ludwig Tewordt, who was part of the superconductivity group hosted at the University of Illinois at Urbana-Champaign (UIUC). His thesis work was on the theoretical study of the physical effects caused by point defects in copper.

In 1962 he obtained the doctoral degree under the combined guidance of Adolf Kratzer and W. Franz. His doctoral work was on the effect of lattice defects on the polarization of the electron gas in solids (thesis titled "Allgemeine Methode zur Bestimmung der durch punktförmige Gitterfehler in Metallen hervorgerufenen Verzerrung des Gitters und Polarisation des Elektronengases"). Through a joint program between the University of Münster and UIUC, he worked fundamental studies on the conductivity in metals, which also earned him the PhD at the latter university, endorsed by James S. Koehler and Frederick Seitz. In the US, Bennemann worked with scientists in a solid-state physics group founded by Seitz in 1959.

== Academic career ==
After obtaining his PhD degree, in 1962–1964, Bennemann worked as a postdoctoral scholar in John Bardeen's group, where he studied macroscopic quantum systems with a focus on quantum liquids and superconductivity. He developed a general method to study the electron redistribution around point defects in noble metals and by using the t-matrix method he formulated a theory to calculate the electron distribution in metals. He also contributed to the understanding of the physical properties of point defects in covalent crystals. and extended the pseudo potential theory, introduced by Phillips, to successfully calculate the properties of diamond.

In 1964–1965, he was appointed as an assistant researcher at the Institute for Mathematical Physics at the University of Karlsruhe and spent the summer of 1965 working in the Cavendish Laboratory, at the University of Cambridge, England. In Neville Mott's group, he studied the superconductivity in ferromagnetic alloys.

Later, he went back to the United States to work in the Institute for the Study of Metals, at the University of Chicago, where he continued with studies of superconductivity in magnetic alloys. Bennemann was especially interested in the role of paramagnetic impurities on the superconducting transition temperature.

In 1967, he was appointed as associate professor at the Department of Physics and Astronomy in the University of Rochester, where he received tenure a year later. At that time he contributed to the understanding of the coexistence of superconductivity and magnetic ordering. Furthermore, he proposed an expression for the electron-phonon coupling constant in terms of measurable normal-state quantities and atomic properties, to help explain the superconducting transition temperature in d-band metals. In 1969, while at the University of Rochester, he was awarded an Alfred P. Sloan Foundation fellowship to pursue studies on the magnetic properties of alloys.

At the end of 1969, he got offers for a full professorship from several universities: the University of California, Los Angeles, Brown University, Georgetown University, McGill University at Montreal, Canada and the Freie Universität Berlin. He decided to return to Germany and accepted a full professorship at the Institute for Theoretical Physics at the Freie Universität Berlin, in Dahlem, West Berlin. He arrived at a city where some of the most impactful physics was developed before the Second World War and which had suffered large devastation during the world conflict. The Freie Universität Berlin was founded in 1948, under especially difficult circumstances, in the American Sector of the divided city subjected to the Russian blockade. At that time the Friedrich-Wilhelms-Universität, where Albert Einstein, Erwin Schrödinger, Max Planck, Werner Heisenberg and others had developed their seminal work, was split into the Humboldt Universität located in the east sector and the Freie Universität in the west. Today's Institute for Theoretical Physics, was founded at the beginning of the 1970s when the university was reorganized and underwent extensive expansion. It took more than 20 years to fully organize the university and provide the infrastructure.

Bennemann contributed to the creation of an international physics institute of excellence. In the decades that followed, he ran projects on many important problems in condensed matter physics. With the collaboration of international scientists and graduate students he contributed to the scientific environment at the Freie Universität, and the development of science in other countries, including Argentina, Brazil and Mexico.

== Bennemann's impact and legacy through trainees ==
Bennemann has always been interested in current physics problems. By offering problems in the frontiers of knowledge to graduate students, as well as Postdoctoral fellows and consolidated collaborators, his group could achieve important contributions in condensed matter physics and nanoscience.

The intense intellectual activity led several of his trainees to follow carriers in the academia. Contributions through the doctoral theses of his graduate students, who are now faculty personnel, include: Karol Penson, now at the Sorbonne University in Paris, France, studied the spin-Peierls transition for one-dimensional classical and quantum chains. José Luis Morán-López, now at the Institute for Scientific and Technological Research in San Luis Potosí, Mexico, contributed to the understanding of the electronic structure and properties of binary alloys and developed a theory for magnetism of transition metals. David Tománek, now retired at Michigan State University, United States, was involved in the development of a theory for the structural and electronic properties of surfaces, including reconstruction and photoemission spectra. Sugata Mukherjee, who was at the Bose National Centre for Basic Science in Kolkata, India, until he died in 2020, performed theoretical studies of the atomic structure at the surface of transition metals and alloys. Peter Jensen, now retired from the Kläre-Bloch-Schule Berlin, Germany, worked out spin-1 Ising models with competing interactions. Gustavo Pastor, Universität Kassel, Germany, studied the electronic properties of metal clusters. Martín García, also at Universität Kassel, studied the bond character in divalent metal clusters. Joerg Schmalian, at the Karlsruhe Institute of Technology, Germany, studied strongly correlated high-temperature superconductors. Gunnar Baumgärtel, who is patent attorney and senior partner at Maikowski-Ninnemann, Berlin, Germany, worked on the role of magnetic excitations in High Tc superconductors. Finally, Harald Jeschke, now at Okayama University, Japan, made contributions to the understanding of optically created non-equilibrium in covalent solids.

Other of Bennemann's graduate students were or are now in the industrial or financial sectors. Günther Kerker (worked at Bayer, Switzerland, until he died in 2016) studied the strong-coupling superconductivity in transition-metal alloys. Roland Linke (worked at the Deutsche Telephonwerke, Berlin, Germany, until he became seriously disabled and died several years later) contributed to the understanding of itinerant magnetism in transition metals. Ute Pustogowa (Hypo Vereinsbank-Unicredit, Germany) contributed to the understanding of the magneto-optic non-linear effects in transition metals. Sören Grabowski (Partner at EY Parthenon, Berlin, Germany - formerly also Munich, San Diego & Moscow) contributed to the understanding of the interdependence of spin fluctuations and high-Tc superconductivity. Matthias Langer (LK Test Solutions, München, Germany) worked on a theory to explain the elementary excitations in the normal state of high Tc superconductors. Thomas Luce (MicroVision, Nürnberg, Germany) studied problems in non-linear occurred at surfaces and thin films. Roland Knorren (EMEA at Oracle, Hamburg, Germany) studied the ultrafast dynamics of non-equilibrium electrons in noble and transition metals. Ilya Grigorenko (CLS Group, New York, USA) studied ultrafast dynamics and optimal control of electrons in nanostructures. Roman Brinzanik (Kraftwerk Renewable Power Solutions GmbH, Berlin) performed a Monte Carlo study of magnetic nanostructures during growth.

== Achievements in collaboration with Habilitanden ==
In some European countries, in order to get a university professorship, to teach and to advice students, there was a requirement, after the doctoral degree, to tackle a problem in physics and to defend the results in an oral presentation. It is known as habilitation.

Karl Bennemann was also very active in advising young scientists through the habilitation processes: Arno Holz presented a study of a new phase diagram for the metal-insulator transition in n-type semiconductors. Pedro U. Schlottmann tackled the coexistence of spin-glass and ferromagnetic phases in alloys with two magnetic components and exchange interactions of opposite signs. Karol A. Penson carried out a study of the static and dynamic aspects of spin-lattice Peierls instabilities in quasi-one-dimensional systems. Peter Stampfli was involved with the analysis of the polarizability of small spherical metallic clusters.

Wolfgang Hübner presented advances on the understanding of non-linear optics. Peter J. Jensen, lead a study of the magnetic properties of thin ferromagnetic films and Martín E. García, developed a theory for ultrafast phenomena in clusters and solids.

== Personal life ==
He is the youngest of three children. His father was a businessman in Münster. Bennemann lived his childhood in a small village close to Münster. He married in 1960 and has three sons.

== Books ==
- The Physics of Liquid and Solid He, Ed. K.H. Bennemann and J.B. Ketterson (Willey and Sons, 1976)
- The Physics of Liquid and Solid He, Ed. K.H. Bennemann and J.B. Ketterson (Willey and Sons, 1978)
- Non-linear optics in Metals, K.H. Bennemann, (Oxford University Press, 1999)
- The Physics of Sueprconductors, Volume 1, Conventional and High-Tc Superconductors, Ed. K.H. Bennemann and J.B. Ketterson (Springer Verlag, 2003)
- The Physics of Superconductors, Volume 2, Superconductivity in Nanostructures, High-Tc and Novel Superconductors, Organic Superconductors, Ed. K.H. Bennemann and J.B. Ketterson (Springer Verlag, 2004)
- Novel Superfluids, Volume 1, Ed. K.H. Bennemann and J.B. Ketterson (Oxford University Press, 2013)
- Novel Superfluids, Volume 2, Ed. K.H. Bennemann and J.B. Ketterson (Oxford University Press, 2015)
