= Josephine Clara Goldmark =

American advocate of labor law reform (1877–1950)

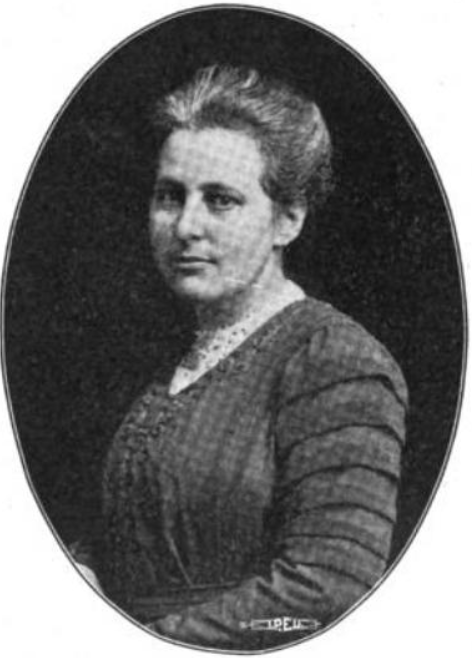
- Josephine Goldmark, from a 1912 publication
- Born: October 13, 1877; Brooklyn, New York
- Died: December 15, 1950 (aged 73); White Plains, New York
- Education: Bryn Mawr College
- Occupation: American legal reformer
- Parent(s): Joseph Goldmark (1819–1881); Regina (Wehle) Goldmark

Josephine Clara Goldmark (October 13, 1877 – December 15, 1950) was an advocate of labor law reform in the United States during the early 20th century. Her work against child labor and for wages-and-hours legislation (the 8-hour day, minimum wage) was influential in the passage of the Keating–Owen Act in 1916 and the later Fair Labor Standards Act of 1937.

== Biography ==
After graduating from Bryn Mawr College in 1898, Goldmark went to work for Florence Kelley at the National Consumers League (NCL), where she later became the chairman of the committee on labor laws.

Goldmark was an aggressive investigator of labor conditions and wrote prolifically about her findings. Her research about the effects of industrial work, low wages, and long hours on workers, particularly women and child labor, had a major effect on United States labor law. In 1908, she compiled a major amicus curiae brief for the United States Supreme Court case Muller v. Oregon, which is popularly known as the Brandeis Brief after her brother-in-law Louis Brandeis, whose name appeared on it. The brief was instrumental in getting the Supreme Court to declare that state maximum-hours laws were constitutional. In 1911, Goldmark was part of the investigating committee into the Triangle Shirtwaist Factory Fire. The following year, the Russell Sage Foundation published her book Fatigue and Efficiency, a study of the effects of long hours on workers' health and job performance.

Goldmark worked for many years as a researcher of labor conditions and their effects in different working environments. She served as a consulting expert for a number of companies, philanthropies, and government commissions, and she was vice chair of the New York City Child Labor Commission

Between 1919 and 1923, Goldmark researched the state of nursing schools in the United States with funding from the Rockefeller Foundation. She published her research in Nursing and Nursing Education in the United States (1923), which was influential in modernizing American nursing education. She also authored a biography of Florence Kelley, Impatient Crusader, which was published posthumously in 1950.

Goldmark was the youngest of ten children. Her sister, Pauline, was the secretary for the New York City office of the National Consumers League. Her sister, Alice, was married to Louis Brandeis. Josephine Goldmark lived for many years at New York City's Henry Street Settlement. She died in White Plains, New York, in 1950 at the age of 73.

== Publications ==
- "Working women and the laws: a record of neglect," in Woman's work and organizations, ed. Emory R. Johnson. Philadelphia: American Academy of Political and Social Science, 1906. Pages 64–78.
- Labour laws for women in the United States. London: Women's Industrial Council, 1907.
- Josephine Goldmark, et al. "The Work of the National Consumers' League. During the Year Ending March 1, 1910," Annals of the American Academy of Political and Social Science Vol. 36, Supplement (Sept 1910) pp 1–75 in JSTOR
- Handbook of laws regulating women's hours of labor. New York: National Consumers League, 1912.
- Fatigue and efficiency: a study in industry. New York: Survey Associates, 1913.
- Pilgrims of '48: One man's part in the Austrian revolution of 1848; and a family migration to America. H. Milford, Oxford University Press, 1930.
- Impatient crusader: Florence Kelley's life story. Urbana: University of Illinois, 1953.
- Poems, Privately printed, 1958.
