= Henry C. Goldmark =

American engineer (1857–1941)

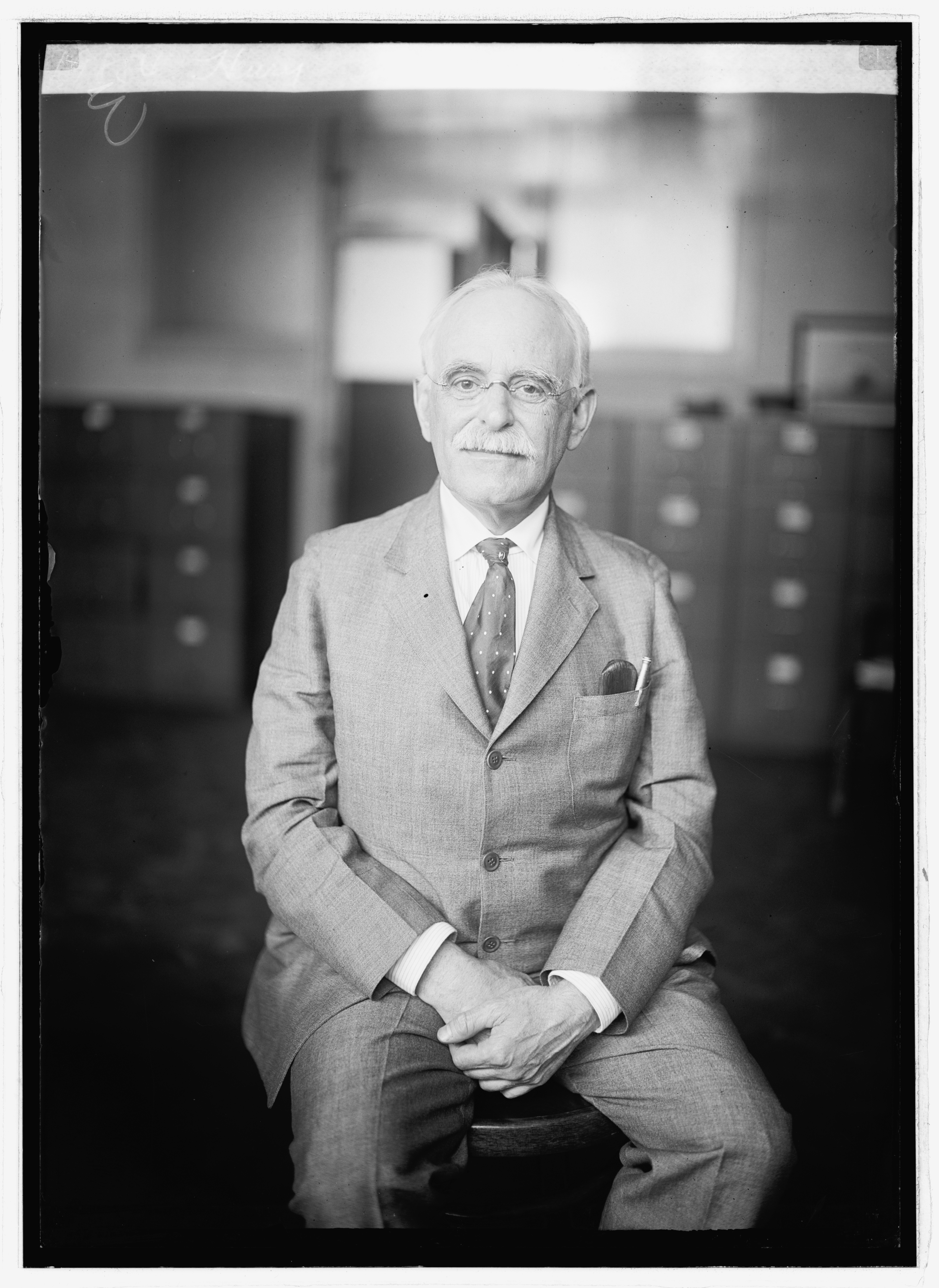
- Born: June 15, 1857; New York, New York
- Died: January 15, 1941 (aged 83); Nyack, New York
- Education: New York University Polytechnic School of Engineering; Harvard University; Royal Polytechnic University
- Occupation: Engineer
- Spouse: Mary Carter Tomkins (m. 1899)
- Children: 2

Henry C. Goldmark (June 15 1857 – January 15 1941) was an American engineer who designed and installed the Panama Canal locks.

== Biography ==
Henry Goldmark was born in New York City on June 15, 1857. He was an 1874 graduate of the New York University Polytechnic School of Engineering. He earned a bachelor's degree at Harvard, and graduated from the Royal Polytechnic University at Hanover, German Empire in 1880.

He married Mary Carter Tomkins on June 8, 1899, and they had two children.

He died in Nyack, New York on January 15, 1941, after being struck by an automobile the previous night.
