= Neptunium(III) phosphide =

Neptunium phosphide
Identifiers
CAS Number	41996-79-6
3D model (JSmol)	Interactive image
- InChI: InChI=1S/Np.P Key: AGTDZATXHOWRTO-UHFFFAOYSA-N
- SMILES: [Np]#P

Properties
Chemical formula	NpP
Molar mass	268 g·mol^{−1}
Appearance	black crystals
Density	10.06 g/cm^{3}
Solubility in water	insoluble

Related compounds
Related compounds	Neptunium(IV) phosphide
- Except where otherwise noted, data are given for materials in their standard state (at 25 °C [77 °F], 100 kPa). Infobox references

Neptunium(III) phosphide is a binary inorganic compound of neptunium metal and phosphorus with the chemical formula NpP.

== Preparation ==
Neptunium(III) phosphide can be formed from the fusion of stoichiometric amounts of neptunium and phosphorus at 750 °C:

4 Np + P_{4} → 4 NpP

== Physical properties ==
Neptunium(III) phosphide forms black crystals of NaCl-structure. It is insoluble in water. It is antiferromagnetic below 130 K.
