= Pauline Goldmark =

American social reformer (1874–1962)

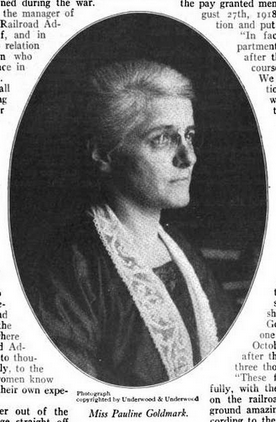
- Goldmark in the March 1920 issue of The Green Book Magazine
- Born: Pauline Dorothea Goldmark; February 21, 1874; New York City, New York, U.S.
- Died: October 18, 1962 (aged 88); New York City, New York
- Education: Bryn Mawr College; Columbia University
- Occupation: Social reformer
- Relatives: Joseph Goldmark (father); Josephine Clara Goldmark (sister); Karl Goldmark (uncle); Rubin Goldmark (cousin); Felix Adler (brother-in-law); Louis Brandeis (brother-in-law)

Pauline Dorothea Goldmark (February 21, 1874 – October 18, 1962) was an American social reformer, focused on equal pay and the health aspects of women's work.

== Early life ==
Pauline Dorothea Goldmark was born in Brooklyn, New York, the daughter of Joseph Goldmark and Regina (née Wehle) Goldmark. Her father was a doctor and a chemist; both parents were Jewish immigrants from central Europe. Goldmark earned a degree in biology at Bryn Mawr College in 1896, and pursued graduate studies at Columbia University. Her younger sister was labor reformer Josephine Clara Goldmark. Her brothers-in-law included Felix Adler and Louis Brandeis. Her uncle Karl Goldmark was a composer in Vienna, and her cousin Rubin Goldmark was a composer in New York City.

== Career ==
Goldmark was an executive of the Consumers' League of New York, and served on the National Consumers League's board for forty years. She was associate director of the New York School of Philanthropy, and served on the New York State Industrial Board, the New York State Factory Investigating Commission. During World War I she was secretary of the United States Department of Labor's Commission on Women in Industry, she was manager of the Women's Service Section, United States Railway Administration. She was assistant director of research at the Russell Sage Foundation, and consulted on women's working conditions for AT&T after 1919.

== Publications ==
Books by Pauline Goldmark are mostly research reports, including Women and Children in the Canneries (1908), Preliminary Report of the Factory Investigating Committee (1912), Second Report of the Factory Investigating Committee (1913), The Truth About Wage-Earning Women and the State (1912), West Side Studies (1914) and The Longshoremen (1915, with Charles Brinton Barnes). She and Mary Hopkins also compiled a poetry collection, The Gypsy Trail: An Anthology for Campers (1914).

== Personal life ==
Pauline Goldmark was a close friend and correspondent of William James. She died in 1962, aged 88 years, in New York. Her papers, and her sister Josephine's, are archived at the Arthur and Elizabeth Schlesinger Library on the History of Women in America, Radcliffe Institute for Advanced Study, Harvard University. Related family papers are in the Goldmark Family Collection, Center for Jewish History.
