= Phosphorene =

Crystalline structure of phosphorus

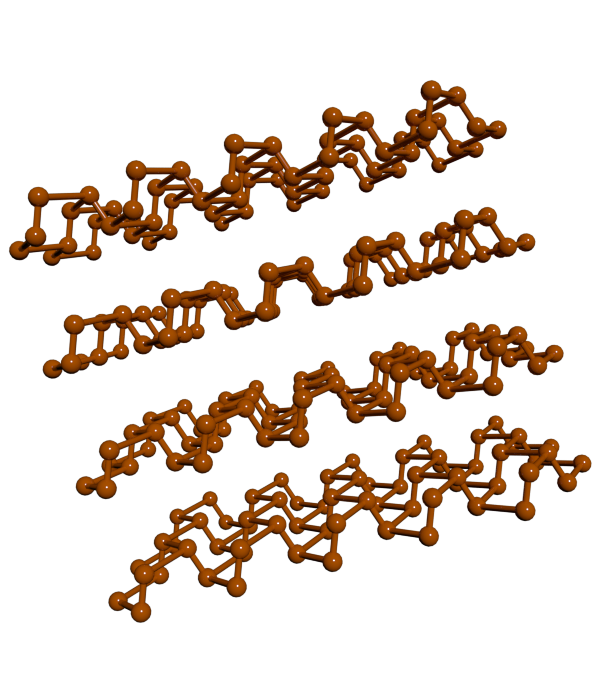
Bulk black phosphorus consists of multiple phosphorene sheets

Phosphorene is a two-dimensional material consisting of phosphorus. It consists of a single layer of black phosphorus, the most stable allotrope of phosphorus. Phosphorene is analogous to graphene (single layer graphite). Among two-dimensional materials, phosphorene is a competitor to graphene because it has a nonzero fundamental band gap that can be modulated by strain and the number of layers in a stack. Phosphorene was first isolated in 2014 by mechanical exfoliation. Liquid exfoliation is a promising method for scalable phosphorene production.

== History ==
In 1914 black phosphorus, a layered, semiconducting allotrope of phosphorus, was synthesized. This allotrope exhibits high carrier mobility. In 2014, several groups isolated single-layer phosphorene, a monolayer of black phosphorus. It attracted renewed attention because of its potential in optoelectronics and electronics due to its band gap, which can be tuned via modifying its thickness, anisotropic photoelectronic properties and carrier mobility. Phosphorene was initially prepared using mechanical cleavage, a commonly used technique in graphene production.

In 2023, alloys of arsenic-phosphorene displayed higher hole mobility than pure phosphorene and were also magnetic.

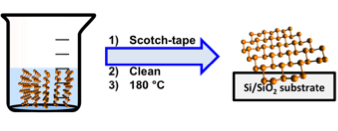
Scotch-tape-based microcleavage synthesis of phosphorene

== Synthesis ==
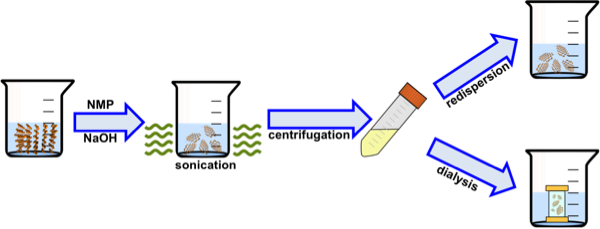
Liquid exfoliation based synthesis of phosphorene

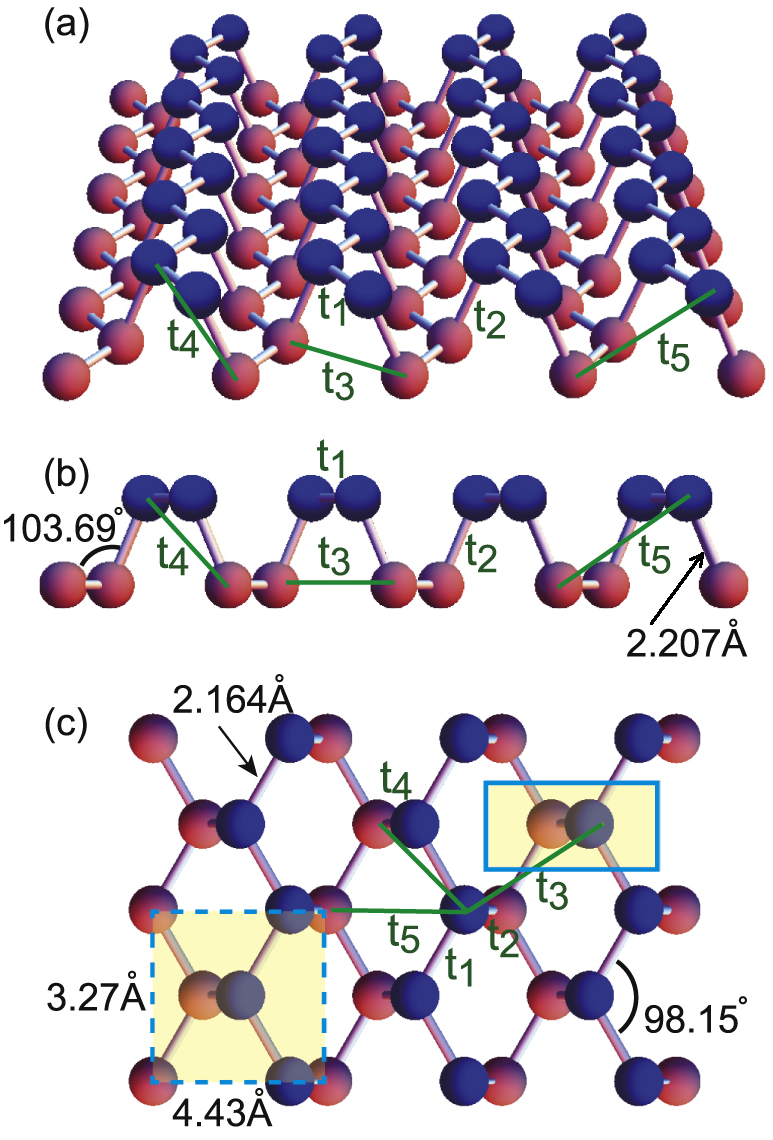
Phosphorene structure: (a) tilted view, (b) side view, (c) top view. Red (blue) balls represent phosphorus atoms in the lower (upper) layer.

Synthesis of phosphorene is a significant challenge. Currently, there are two main ways of phosphorene production: scotch-tape-based microcleavage and liquid exfoliation, while several other methods are being developed as well. Phosphorene production from plasma etching has also been reported.

In scotch-tape-based microcleavage, phosphorene is mechanically exfoliated from a bulk of black phosphorus crystal using scotch-tape. Phosphorene is then transferred on a Si/SiO_{2} substrate, where it is then cleaned with acetone, isopropyl alcohol and methanol to remove any scotch tape residue. The sample is then heated to 180 °C to remove solvent residue.

In the liquid exfoliation method, first reported by Brent et al. in 2014 and modified by others, bulk black phosphorus is first ground in a mortar and pestle and then sonicated in deoxygenated, anhydrous organic liquids such as NMP under an inert atmosphere using low-power bath sonication. Suspensions are then centrifuged for 30 minutes to filter out the unexfoliated black phosphorus. Resulting 2D monolayer and few-layer phosphorene unoxidized and crystalline structure, while exposure to air oxidizes the phosphorene and produces acid.

Another variation of liquid exfoliation is "basic N-methyl-2-pyrrolidone (NMP) liquid exfoliation". Bulk black phosphorene is added to a saturated NaOH/NMP solution, which is further sonicated for 4 hours to conduct liquid exfoliation. The solution is then centrifuged twice, first for 10 minutes to remove any unexfoliated black phosphorus and then for 20 minutes at a higher speed to separate thick layers of phosphorene (5–12 layers) from NMP. The supernatant then is centrifuged again at higher speed for another 20 minutes to separate thinner layers of phosphorene (1–7 layers). The precipitate from centrifugation is then redispersed in water and washed several times by deionized water. Phosphorene/water solution is dropped onto silicon with a 280-nm SiO_{2} surface, where it is further dried under vacuum. NMP liquid exfoliation method was shown to yield phosphorene with controllable size and layer number, excellent water stability and in high yield.

The disadvantage of the current methods includes long sonication time, high boiling point solvents, and low efficiency. Therefore, other physical methods for liquid exfoliation are still under development. A laser-assisted method developed by Zheng and co-workers showed a promising yield of up to 90% within 5 minutes. The laser photon interacts with the surface of bulk black phosphorus crystal, causing a plasma and solvent bubbles to weaken the interlayer interaction. Depending on the laser energy, solvent (ethanol, methanol, hexane, etc.) and irradiation time, the layer number and lateral size of the phosphorene were controlled.

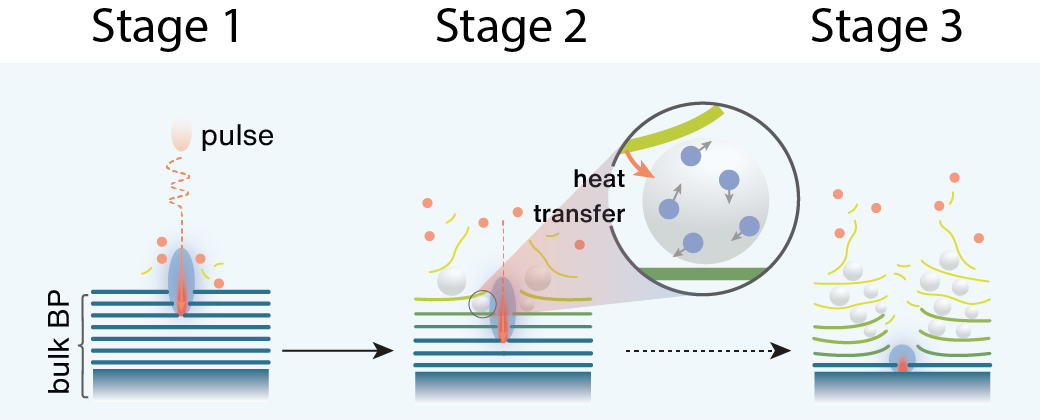
Laser-assisted exfoliation of black phosphorus in liquid.

It is still a challenge to directly epitaxially grow 2D phosphorene because the stability of black phosphorene is highly sensitive to substrate, which is understanding by theoretical simulations.

== Properties ==
=== Structure ===
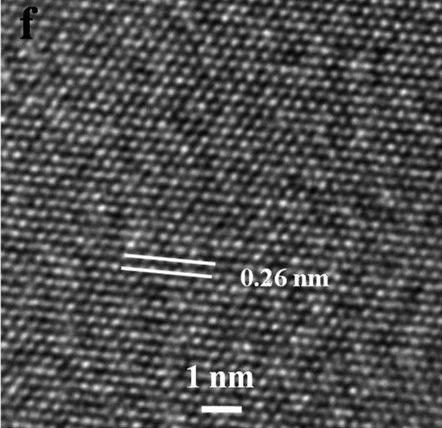
Top-view electron micrograph of phosphorene

Phosphorene 2D materials are composed of individual layers held together by van der Waals forces in lieu of covalent or ionic bonds that are found in most materials. There are three electrons within the 3p orbitals of the phosphorus atom, thus, giving rise to sp^{3} hybridization of each phosphorus atom within the phosphorene structure. Monolayered phosphorene exhibits the structure of a quadrangular pyramid because three electrons of P atom bond with three other P atoms covalently at 2.18 Å leaving one lone pair. Two of the phosphorus atoms are in the plane of the layer at 99° from one another, and the third phosphorus is between the layers at 103°, yielding an average angle of 102°.

According to density functional theory (DFT) calculations, phosphorene forms in a honeycomb lattice structure with notable nonplanarity in the shape of structural ridges. It is predicted that crystal structure of black phosphorus can be discriminated under high pressure. This is mostly due to the anisotropic compressibility of black phosphorus because of the asymmetrical crystal structures. Subsequently, the van der Waals bond can be greatly compressed in the z-direction. However, there is a great variation in compressibility across the orthogonal x-y plane.

It is reported that controlling the centrifugal speed of production may aid in regulating the thickness of a material. For example, centrifuging at 18,000 rpm during synthesis produced phosphorene with an average diameter of 210 nm and a thickness of 2.8 ± 1.5 nm (2–7 layers).

=== Band gap and conductivity ===
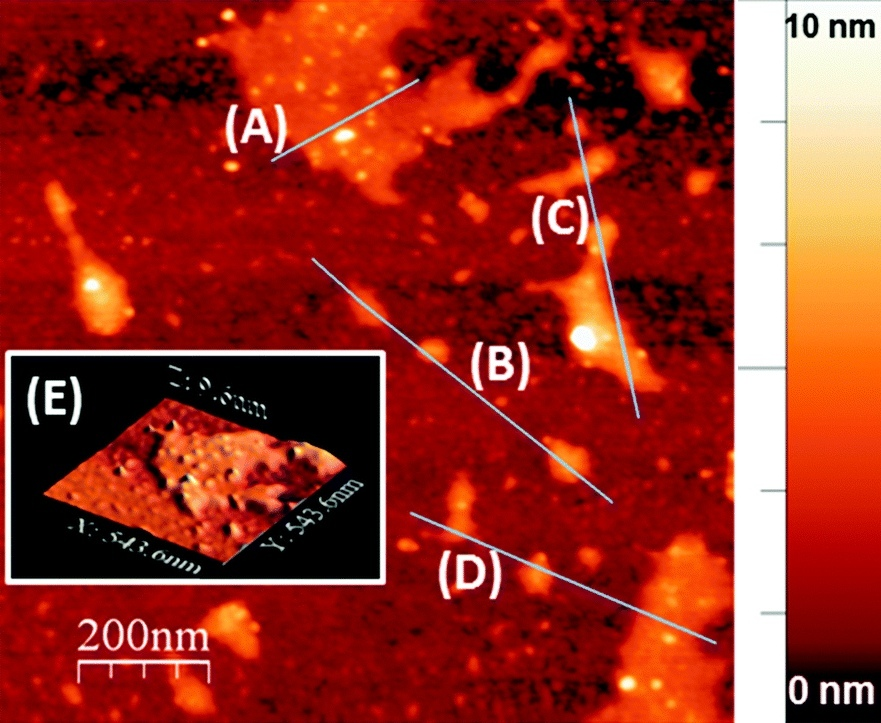
AFM images of few-layer phosphorene sheets produced by ultrasonic exfoliation of black phosphorus in N-methyl-2-pyrrolidone and spin-coated onto a SiO_{2}/Si substrate.

Phosphorene has a thickness dependent direct band gap that changes to 1.88 eV in a monolayer from 0.3 eV in the bulk. Increase in band gap value in single-layer phosphorene is predicted to be caused by the absence of interlayer hybridization near the top of the valence and bottom of the conduction band. A pronounced peak centered at around 1.45 eV suggests the band gap structure in few- or single-layer phosphorene difference from bulk crystals.

In vacuum or on weak substrate, an interesting reconstruction with nanotubed termination of phosphorene edge is very easy to happen, transforming phosphorene edge from metallic to semiconducting.

=== Air stability ===
AFM of few-layer phosphorene sample continuously taken for 7 days. Phosphorene reacts with oxygen and water to develop liquid phase bubbles.

One major disadvantage of phosphorene is its limited air-stability. Composed of hygroscopic phosphorus and with extremely high surface-to-volume ratio, phosphorene reacts with water vapor and oxygen assisted by visible light to degrade within the scope of hours. Through the degradation process, phosphorene (solid) reacts with oxygen/water to develop liquid phase acid 'bubbles' on the surface, and finally evaporate (vapor) to fully vanish (S-B-V degradation) and severely reducing overall quality.

== Applications ==
=== Transistor ===
Researchers have fabricated transistors of phosphorene to examine its performance in actual devices. Phosphorene-based transistor consists of a channel of 1.0 μm and uses few layered phosphorene with a thickness varying from 2.1 to over 20 nm. Reduction of the total resistance with decreasing gate voltage is observed, indicating the p-type characteristic of phosphorene. Linear I-V relationship of transistor at low drain bias suggests good contact properties at the phosphorene/metal interface. Good current saturation at high drain bias values was observed. However, it was seen that the mobility is reduced in few-layer phosphorene when compared to bulk black phosphorus. Field-effect mobility of phosphorene-based transistor shows a strong thickness dependence, peaking at around 5 nm and decrease steadily with further increase of crystal thickness.

Atomic layer deposition (ALD) dielectric layer and/or hydrophobic polymer is used as encapsulation layers in order to prevent device degradation and failure. Phosphorene devices are reported to maintain their function for weeks with encapsulation layer, whereas experience device failure within a week when exposed to ambient condition.

=== Battery electrode ===
Phosphorene is considered a promising anode material for rechargeable batteries, such as lithium-ion batteries. The interlayer space allows lithium storage and transfer. The layer number and lateral size of phosphorene affect the stability and capacity of the anode.

=== Inverter ===
Researchers have also constructed the CMOS inverter (logic circuit) by combining a phosphorene PMOS transistor with a MoS_{2} NMOS transistor, achieving high heterogeneous integration of semiconducting phosphorene crystals as a new channel material for potential electronic applications. In the inverter, the power supply voltage is set to be 1 V. The output voltage shows a clear transition from VDD to 0 within the input voltage range from −10 to −2 V. A maximum gain of ~1.4 is attained.

=== Solar-cell donor material (optoelectronics) ===
The potential applications of mixed bilayer phosphorene in solar-cell material was examined as well.

=== Flexible circuits ===
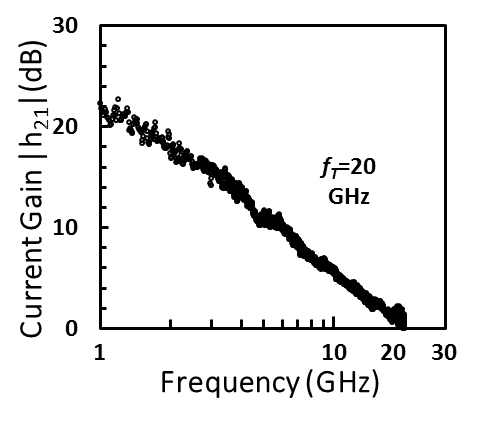
Electrical characteristic of a flexible black phosphorus transistor showing an intrinsic cutoff frequency of 20 GHz.

Phosphorene is a promising candidate for flexible nano systems due to its ultra-thin nature with ideal electrostatic control and superior mechanical flexibility. Researchers have demonstrated the flexible transistors, circuits and AM demodulator based on few-layer phosphorus, showing enhanced am bipolar transport with high room temperature carrier mobility as high as ~310 cm^{2}/Vs and strong current saturation. Fundamental circuit units including digital inverter, voltage amplifier and frequency doubler have been realized. Radio frequency (RF) transistors with highest intrinsic cutoff frequency of 20 GHz has been realized for potential applications in high frequency flexible smart nano systems.

== See also ==
- Borophene
- Germanene
- Graphene
- Silicene
- Stanene
