= Red phosphorus =

Form of phosphorus

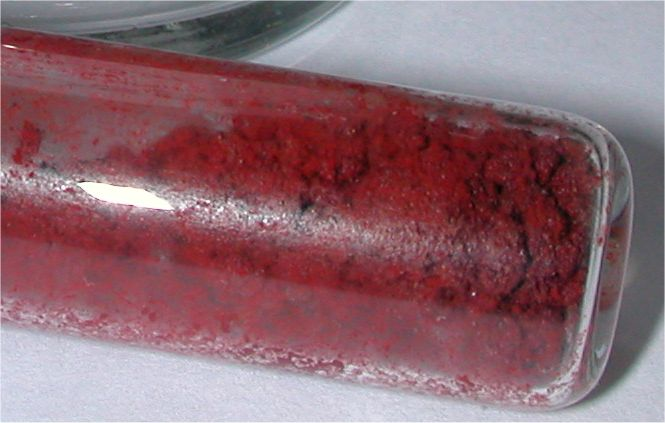
- A sample of red phosphorus

Identifiers
CAS Number	7723-14-0
3D model (JSmol)	Interactive image
DrugBank	DB14151
EC Number	231-768-7
PubChem CID	5462309
UNII	27YLU75U4W
UN number	1338
CompTox Dashboard (EPA)	DTXSID1024382
- InChI: InChI=1S/P; Key: OAICVXFJPJFONN-UHFFFAOYSA-N
- SMILES: [P]

Properties
Chemical formula	P
Molar mass	30.974 g·mol^{−1}
Density	2.34 g/cm^{3}
Melting point	590 °C (1,094 °F; 863 K)

Hazards
NFPA 704 (fire diamond)	1 1 1
- Except where otherwise noted, data are given for materials in their standard state (at 25 °C [77 °F], 100 kPa). Infobox references

Red phosphorus is the common name of several forms of elemental phosphorus, often considered one of its allotropes. Its most common shape is an amorphous polymeric red solid that is stable in air.

Amorphous red phosphorus is easily obtained when exposing white phosphorus to sunlight or heating, which was discovered in 1847 by Anton von Schrötter. When sublimed in a vacuum, amorphous red phosphorus can transform into a crystalline form, known either as violet or Hittorf's phosphorus, after the name of its discoverer. When this process is carried out in the presence of iodine, another crystalline is obtained alongside it, called fibrous red phosphorus.

Applications of amorphous red phosphorus include matches and fire retardants.

== Amorphous red phosphorus ==
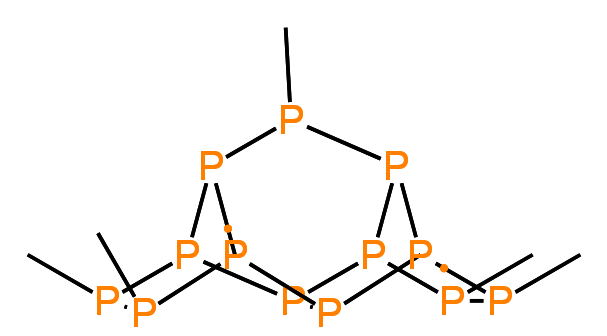
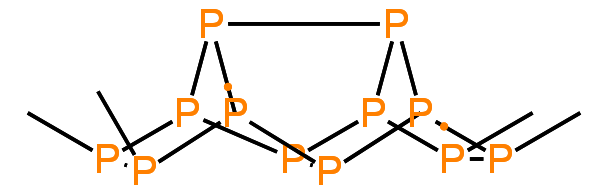
Amorphous red phosphorus chain fragments, with (top) or without (bottom) interchain connection

Amorphous red phosphorus is polymeric in structure and therefore insoluble in most solvents. It is easily obtained by irradiation or heating of white phosphorus.

The standard enthalpy of formation of amorphous red phosphorus is −17.6 kJ/mol. it is the most kinetically stable form of phosphorus. Because of this, it does not exhibit the intense and comprehensive reactivity of white phosphorus. and is much more stable under standard conditions. However, it is less stable than black phosphorus, the most thermodynamically stable allotrope of phosphorus.

Because of its polymeric structure, amorphous red phosphorus is insoluble in most solvents. It also shows semiconductor properties.

== Crystalline red phosphorus ==
=== Violet or Hittorf's phosphorus ===
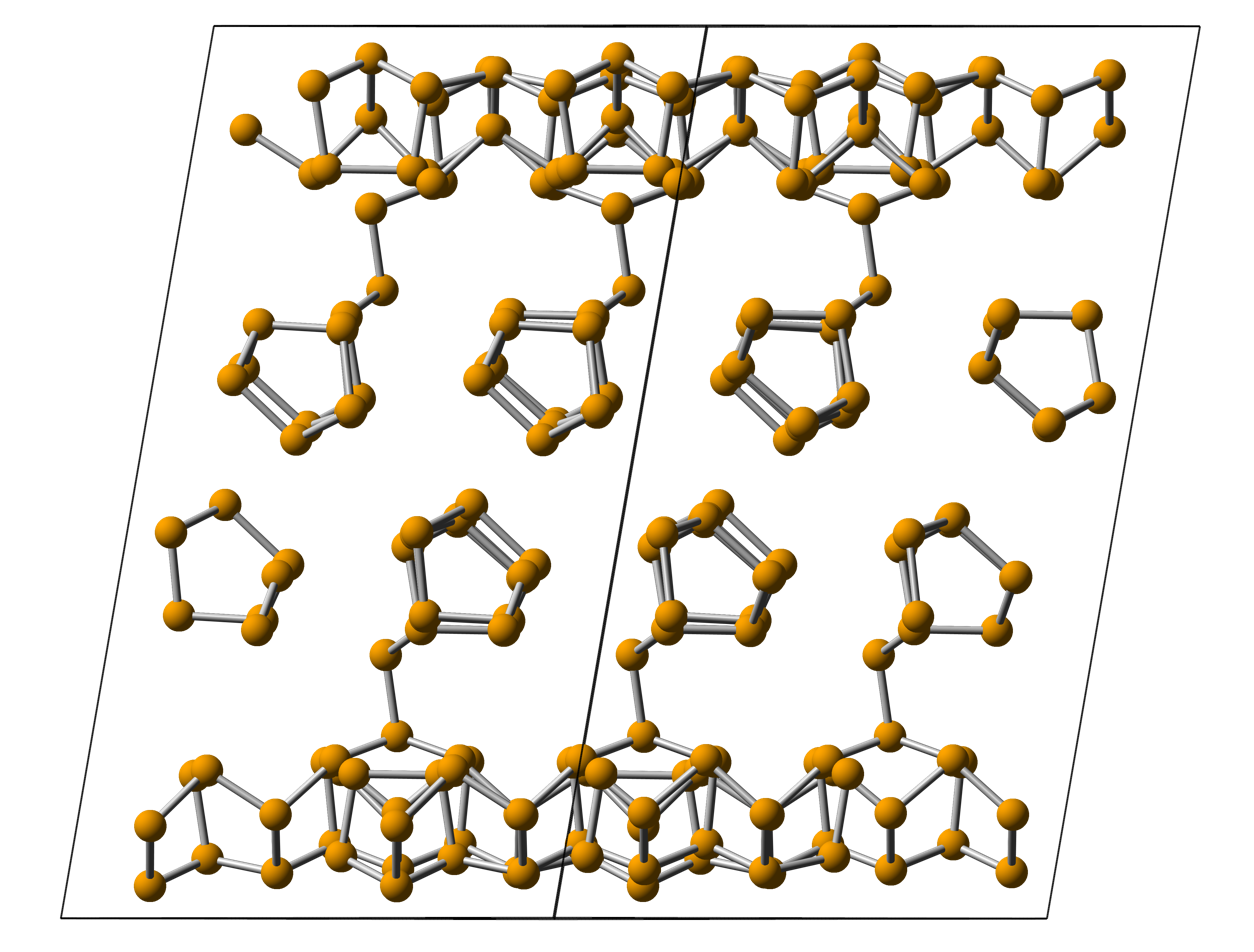
Violet/Hitorff's phosphorus crystal structure

Hittorf's phosphorus, or violet phosphorus, is one of the crystalline forms of red phosphorus.

Violet phosphorus can be prepared by sublimation of red phosphorus in a vacuum, in the presence of an iodine catalyst.

It is chemically similar to red phosphorus. There are, however, subtle differences. Violet phosphorus ignites upon impact in air, while red phosphorus is impact stable. Violet phosphorus doesn't ignite in the presence of air upon room temperature contact with bromine, unlike red phosphorus. The reaction of red phosphorus and bromine alone does not generate a flame.

=== Fibrous red phosphorus ===
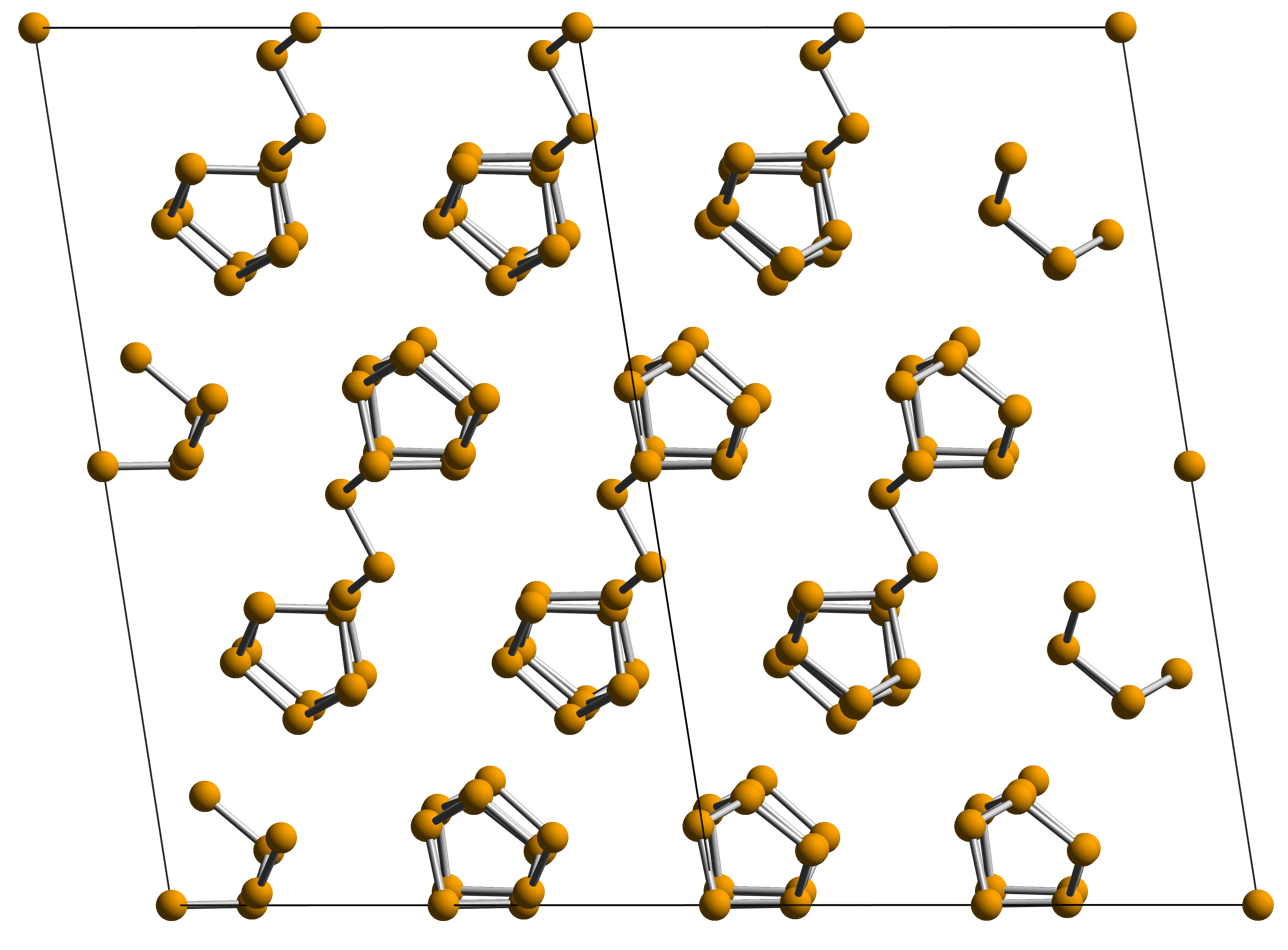
Fibrous red phosphorus crystal structure

Fibrous red phosphorus is another crystalline form of red phosphorus. It is obtained along with violet phosphorus when red phosphorus is sublimed in a vacuum in the presence of iodine.

It is structurally similar to violet phosphorus. However, in fibrous red phosphorus, phosphorus chains lie parallel instead of orthogonal, unlike violet phosphorus.

Fibrous red phosphorus, similar to red phosphorus, displays activity as a photocatalyst.

== Applications ==
=== Flame retardants ===
Amorphous red phosphorus can be used as a very effective flame retardant, especially in thermoplastics (e.g. polyamide) and thermosets (e.g. epoxy resins or polyurethanes). The flame retarding effect is based on the formation of polyphosphoric acid. Together with the organic polymer material, these acids create a char which prevents flame propagation. The safety risks associated with phosphine generation and friction sensitivity of red phosphorus can be effectively minimized by stabilization and micro-encapsulation. For easier handling, red phosphorus is often used in form of dispersions or masterbatches in various carrier systems.

However, for electronic/electrical systems, red phosphorus flame retardant has been effectively banned by major OEMs due to its tendency to induce premature failures. One persistent problem is that red phosphorus in epoxy molding compounds induces elevated leakage current in semiconductor devices. Another problem was acceleration of hydrolysis reactions in PBT insulating material.

=== Safety matches ===
Red phosphorus is used, along with abrasives, on the strike pads of modern matches. Its discovery allowed for the development of safer matches (historically called safety matches), as well as much less hazardous manufacturing. The match head, containing potassium chlorate, will ignite upon friction with the strike pad. However, the red color of the matchhead is due to addition of red iron oxide, and has nothing to do with phosphorus.

=== Chemical synthesis ===
Amorphous red phosphorus reacts with bromine and iodine to form phosphorus tribromide and phosphorus triiodide. Both are useful as halogenating agents, for example in replacing the hydroxyl group of alcohols. Phosphorus triiodide can also be used to produce hydroiodic acid after hydrolysis. This reaction is notable in the illicit production of methamphetamine and Krokodil, where hydrogen iodide acts as a reducing agent.

Red phosphorus is often used to prepare chemicals where the P-P bond is retained. Upon room temperature reaction with sodium chlorite, Na_{2}H_{2}P_{2}O_{6} is formed.

Red phosphorus can be used as an elemental photocatalyst for hydrogen formation from water. It displays a steady hydrogen evolution rates of 633 μmol/(h⋅g) by the formation of small-sized fibrous phosphorus. It has also been researched as a sodium ion battery anode.
