= Graphene =

Hexagonal lattice made of carbon atoms

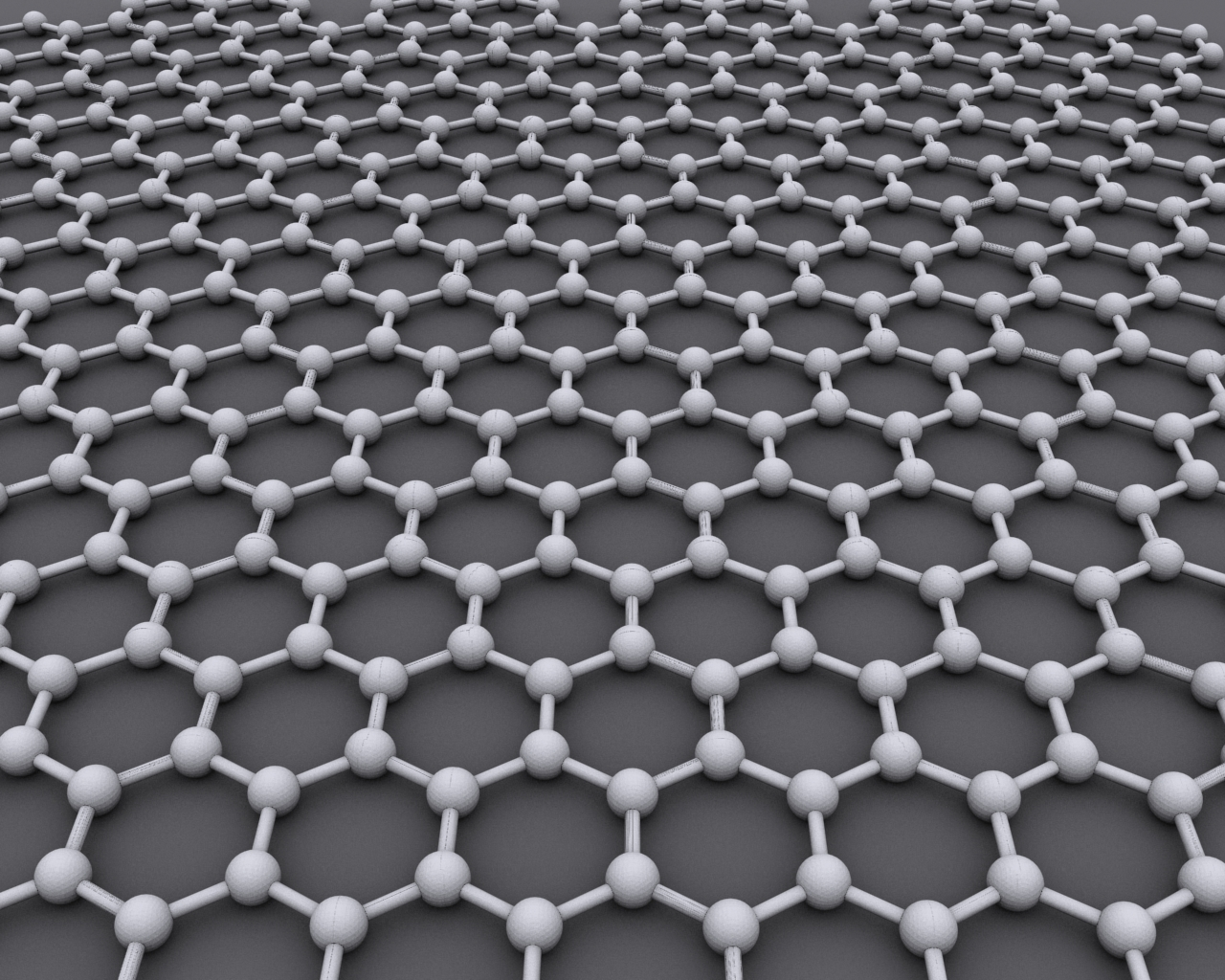
- Graphene is an atomic-scale honeycomb structure made of carbon atoms
- Material type: Allotrope of carbon

Chemical properties
- Chemical formula: C

Mechanical properties
- Young's modulus (E): ≈1 TPa
- Tensile strength (σ_{t}): 130 GPa

Thermal properties
- Thermal conductivity (k): 5300 W⋅m^{−1}⋅K^{−1}

Graphene (/ˈɡræfiːn/) is a variety of the element carbon which occurs naturally in small amounts. In graphene, the carbon forms a sheet of interlocked atoms as hexagons one carbon atom thick. The result resembles the face of a honeycomb. When many hundreds of graphene layers build up, they are called graphite.

In technical terms, graphene is a carbon allotrope consisting of a single layer of atoms arranged in a honeycomb planar nanostructure. The name "graphene" is derived from "graphite" and the suffix -ene, indicating the presence of double bonds within the carbon structure.

Graphene is known for its exceptionally high tensile strength, electrical conductivity, transparency, and being the thinnest two-dimensional material in the world. Despite the nearly transparent nature of a single graphene sheet, graphite (formed from stacked layers of graphene) appears black because it absorbs all visible light wavelengths. On a microscopic scale, graphene is the strongest material ever measured.

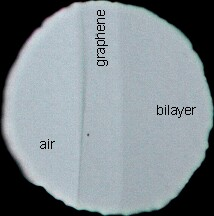
Photograph of a suspended graphene membrane in transmitted light. This one-atom-thick material can be seen with the naked eye because it absorbs approximately 2.3% of light.

The existence of graphene was first theorized in 1947 by Philip R. Wallace during his research on graphite's electronic properties, while the term graphene was first defined by Hanns-Peter Boehm in 1987, when he and coworkers isolated single sheets from graphite. In 2004, the material was isolated and characterized by Andre Geim and Konstantin Novoselov at the University of Manchester using a piece of graphite and adhesive tape. In 2010, Geim and Novoselov were awarded the Nobel Prize in Physics for their "groundbreaking experiments regarding the two-dimensional material graphene". While small amounts of graphene are easy to produce using the method by which it was originally isolated, attempts to scale and automate the manufacturing process for mass production have had limited success out of concern for cost-effectiveness and quality control. The global graphene market was $9 million in 2012, with most of the demand from research and development in semiconductors, electronics, electric batteries, and composites. In 2022, the graphene market reached an estimated global annual revenue of $380 million.

The IUPAC (International Union of Pure and Applied Chemistry) advises using the term "graphite" for the three-dimensional material and reserving "graphene" for discussions about the properties or reactions of single-atom layers. A narrower definition, of "isolated or free-standing graphene", requires that the layer be sufficiently isolated from its environment, but would include layers suspended or transferred to silicon dioxide or silicon carbide.

== History ==
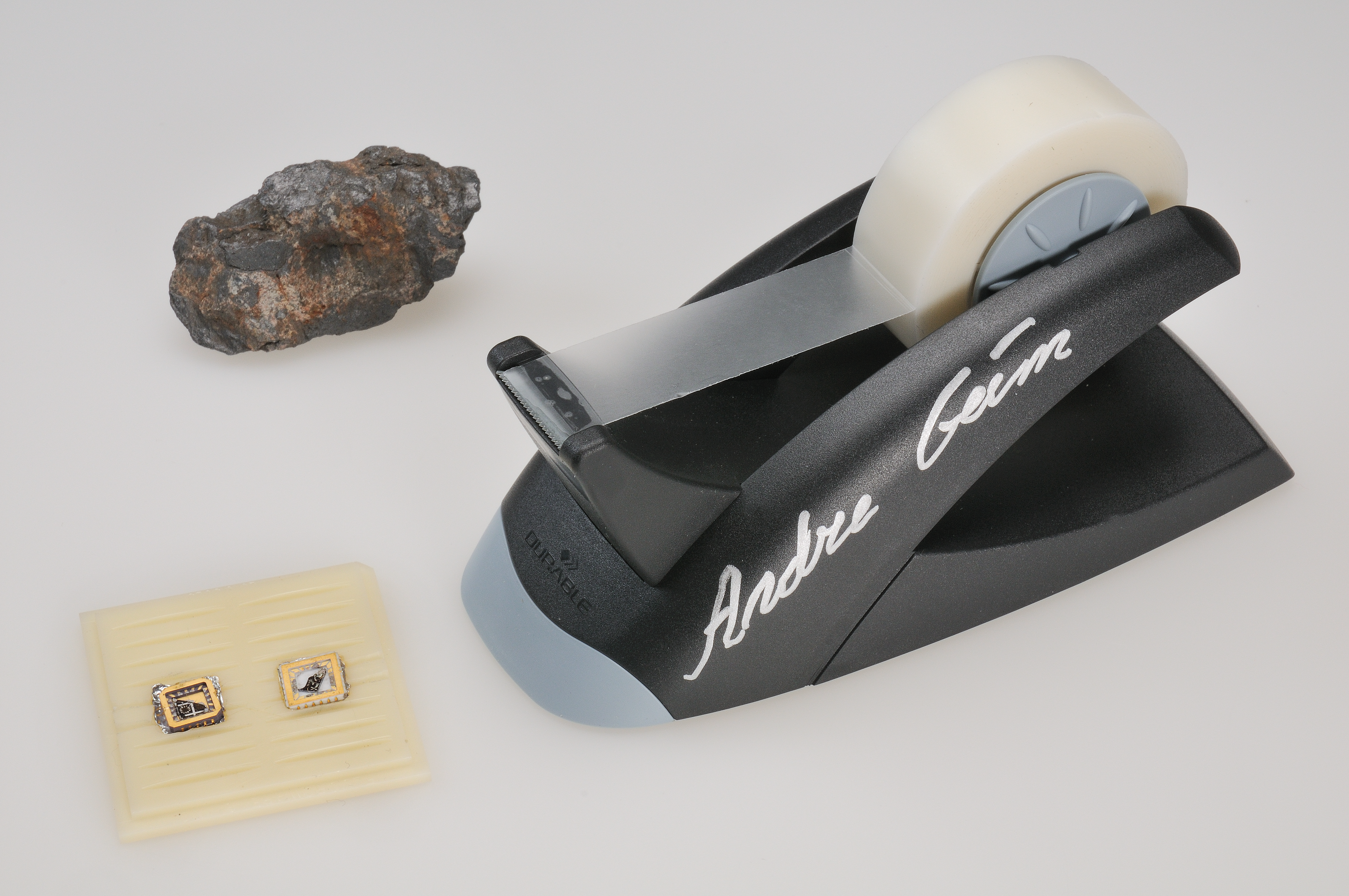
A lump of graphite, a graphene transistor, and a tape dispenser signed by Andre Geim. Donated to the Nobel Museum in Stockholm by Geim and Konstantin Novoselov in 2010.

=== Structure of graphite and its intercalation compounds ===
In 1859, Benjamin Brodie noted the highly lamellar structure of thermally reduced graphite oxide. Researchers used X-ray crystallography in an attempt to determine the structure of graphite. The lack of large single crystal graphite specimens contributed to the independent development of X-ray powder diffraction by Peter Debye and Paul Scherrer in 1915, and Albert Hull in 1916. However, neither of their proposed structures was correct. In 1918, Volkmar Kohlschütter and P. Haenni described the properties of graphite oxide paper. The structure of graphite was successfully determined from single-crystal X-ray diffraction by J. D. Bernal in 1924, while subsequent research tweaked the unit cell parameters.

The theory of graphene was first explored by P. R. Wallace in 1947 as a starting point for understanding the electronic properties of 3D graphite. The emergent massless Dirac equation was separately pointed out in 1984 by Gordon Walter Semenoff, and by David P. Vincenzo and Eugene J. Mele. Semenoff emphasized the occurrence in a magnetic field of an electronic Landau level precisely at the Dirac point. This level is responsible for the anomalous integer Quantum Hall effect.

=== Observations of thin graphite layers and related structures ===
Transmission electron microscopy (TEM) images of thin graphite samples consisting of a few graphene layers were published by G. Ruess and F. Vogt in 1948. Eventually, single layers were also observed directly. Single layers of graphite were also observed by transmission electron microscopy within bulk materials, particularly inside soot obtained by chemical exfoliation.

From 1961 to 1962, Hanns-Peter Boehm published a study of extremely thin flakes of graphite. The study measured flakes as small as ~0.4 nm, which is around 3 atomic layers of amorphous carbon. This was the best possible resolution for TEMs in the 1960s. However, it is impossible to distinguish between suspended monolayer and multilayer graphene by their TEM contrasts, and the only known method is to analyze the relative intensities of various diffraction spots. The first reliable TEM observations of monolayers are likely given in references 24 and 26 of Geim and Novoselov's 2007 review.

In 1975, van Bommel et al. epitaxially grew a single layer of graphite on top of silicon carbide. Others grew single layers of carbon atoms on other materials. This "epitaxial graphene" consists of a single-atom-thick hexagonal lattice of sp^{2}-bonded carbon atoms, as in free-standing graphene. However, there is significant charge transfer between the two materials and, in some cases, hybridization between the d-orbitals of the substrate atoms and π orbitals of graphene, which significantly alter the electronic structure compared to that of free-standing graphene.

Boehm et al. coined the term "graphene" for the hypothetical single-layer structure in 1986. The term was used again in 1987 to describe single sheets of graphite as a constituent of graphite intercalation compounds, which can be seen as crystalline salts of the intercalant and graphene. It was also used in the descriptions of carbon nanotubes by R. Saito and Mildred and Gene Dresselhaus in 1992, and in the description of polycyclic aromatic hydrocarbons in 2000 by S. Wang and others.

Efforts to make thin films of graphite by mechanical exfoliation started in 1990. Initial attempts employed exfoliation techniques similar to the drawing method. Multilayer samples down to 10 nm in thickness were obtained.

In 2002, Robert B. Rutherford and Richard L. Dudman filed for a patent in the US on a method to produce graphene by repeatedly peeling off layers from a graphite flake adhered to a substrate, achieving a graphite thickness of 0.00001 inches (0.00025 millimetres). The key to success was the ability to quickly and efficiently identify graphene flakes on the substrate using optical microscopy, which provided a small but visible contrast between the graphene and the substrate.

Another U.S. patent was filed in the same year by Bor Z. Jang and Wen C. Huang for a method to produce graphene-based on exfoliation followed by attrition.

In 2014, inventor Larry Fullerton patented a process for producing single-layer graphene sheets by graphene's strong diamagnetic properties.

=== Full isolation and characterization ===
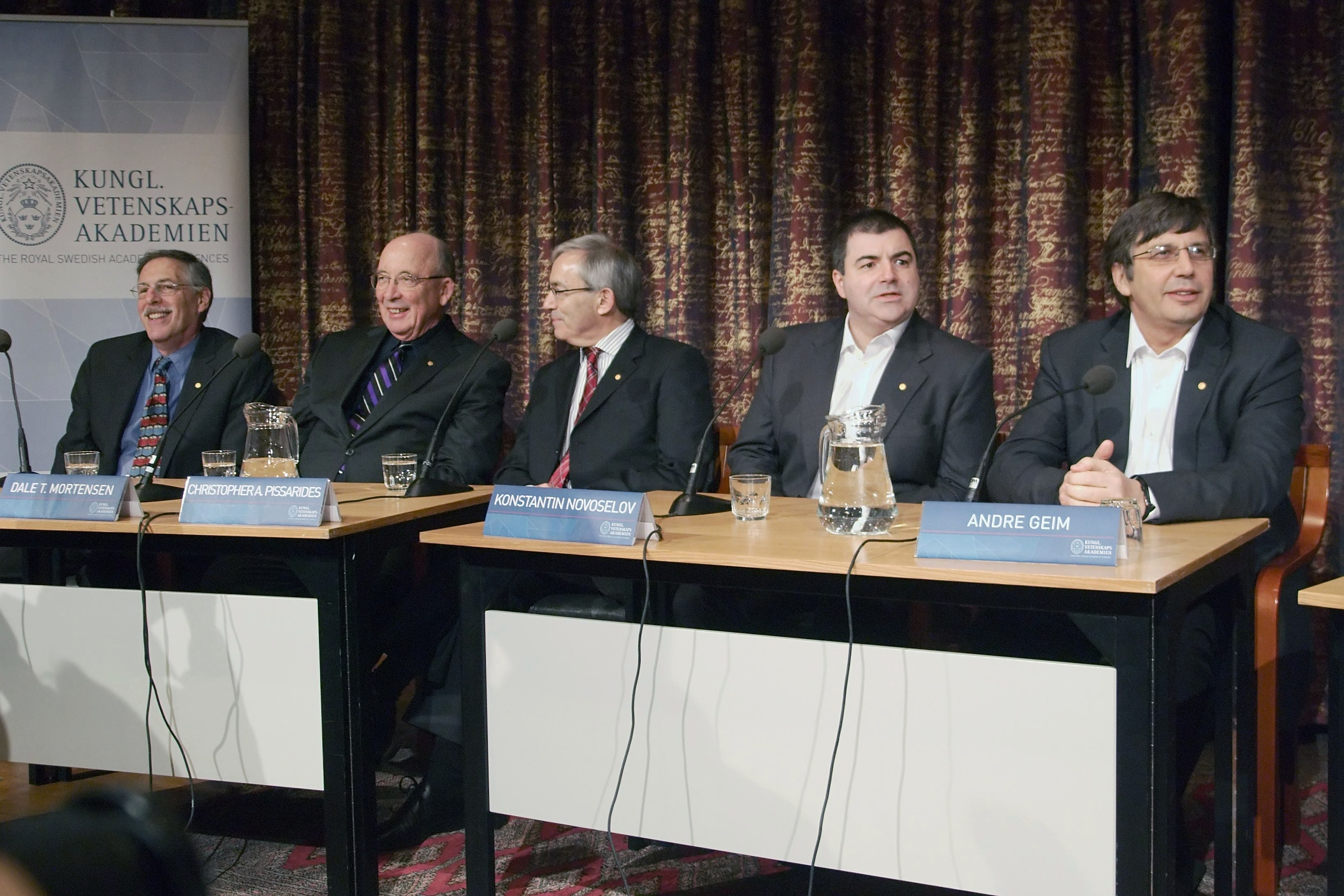
Andre Geim and Konstantin Novoselov at the Nobel Laureate press conference, Royal Swedish Academy of Sciences, 2010.

Graphene was properly isolated and characterized in 2004 by Andre Geim and Konstantin Novoselov at the University of Manchester. They pulled graphene layers from graphite with a common adhesive tape in a process called micro-mechanical cleavage, colloquially referred to as the Scotch tape technique. The graphene flakes were then transferred onto a thin silicon dioxide layer on a silicon plate ("wafer"). The silica electrically isolated the graphene and weakly interacted with it, providing nearly charge-neutral graphene layers. The silicon beneath the SiO_{2} could be used as a "back gate" electrode to vary the charge density in the graphene over a wide range.

This work resulted in the two winning the Nobel Prize in Physics in 2010 for their groundbreaking experiments with graphene. Their publication and the surprisingly easy preparation method that they described, sparked a "graphene gold rush". Research expanded and split off into many different subfields, exploring different exceptional properties of the material—quantum mechanical, electrical, chemical, mechanical, optical, magnetic, etc.

=== Exploring commercial applications ===
Since the early 2000s, several companies and research laboratories have been working to develop commercial applications of graphene. In 2014, a National Graphene Institute was established with that purpose at the University of Manchester, with a £60 million initial funding. In North East England two commercial manufacturers, Applied Graphene Materials and Thomas Swan Limited have begun manufacturing. Cambridge Nanosystems is a large-scale graphene powder production facility in East Anglia.

== Structure ==
Graphene is a single layer of carbon atoms tightly bound in a hexagonal honeycomb lattice. It is an allotrope of carbon in the form of a plane of sp^{2}-bonded atoms with a molecular bond length $R$ = 0.142 nm (1.42 Å).

The area of a hexagon of side $R$ being $\frac{3\sqrt{3}}2R^2$, one hexagonal unit of graphene has an area of $\frac{3\sqrt{3}}20.142^2 = 0.0524$ nm^{2}. There are two carbon atoms per unit, together having a mass of $2\frac{12}{N_0}=.0399\times10^{-18}$ mg. The (two-dimensional) density of graphene is therefore $0.0399/0.0524 = 0.762$ mg per square meter. A kilogram of graphene therefore has an area of $10^6/0.762=1.312\times10^6$ m^{2} or 131.2 hectares.

In a graphene sheet, each atom is connected to its three nearest carbon neighbors by σ-bonds, and a delocalized π-bond, which contributes to a valence band that extends over the whole sheet. This type of bonding is also seen in polycyclic aromatic hydrocarbons. The valence band is touched by a conduction band, making graphene a semimetal with unusual electronic properties that are best described by theories for massless relativistic particles. Charge carriers in graphene show linear, rather than quadratic, dependence of energy on momentum, and field-effect transistors with graphene can be made that show bipolar conduction. Charge transport is ballistic over long distances; the material exhibits large quantum oscillations and large nonlinear diamagnetism.

=== Bonding ===
Carbon orbitals 2s, 2p_{x}, 2p_{y} form the hybrid orbital sp^{2} with three major lobes at 120°. The remaining orbital, p_{z}, extends out of the graphene's plane.

Sigma and pi bonds in graphene. Sigma bonds result from an overlap of sp^{2} hybrid orbitals, whereas pi bonds emerge from tunneling between the protruding p_{z} orbitals.

Three of the four outer-shell electrons of each atom in a graphene sheet occupy three sp^{2} hybrid orbitals – a combination of orbitals s, p_{x} and p_{y} — that are shared with the three nearest atoms, forming σ-bonds. The length of these bonds is about 0.142 nanometers.

The remaining outer-shell electron occupies a p_{z} orbital that is oriented perpendicularly to the plane. These orbitals hybridize together to form two half-filled bands of free-moving electrons, π, and π∗, which are responsible for most of graphene's notable electronic properties. Recent quantitative estimates of aromatic stabilization and limiting size derived from the enthalpies of hydrogenation (ΔH_{hydro}) agree well with the literature reports.

Graphene sheets stack to form graphite with an interplanar spacing of 0.335 nm (3.35 Å).

Graphene sheets in solid form usually show evidence in diffraction for graphite's (002) layering. This is true of some single-walled nanostructures. However, unlayered graphene displaying only (hk0) rings have been observed in the core of presolar graphite onions. TEM studies show faceting at defects in flat graphene sheets and suggest a role for two-dimensional crystallization from a melt.

=== Geometry ===
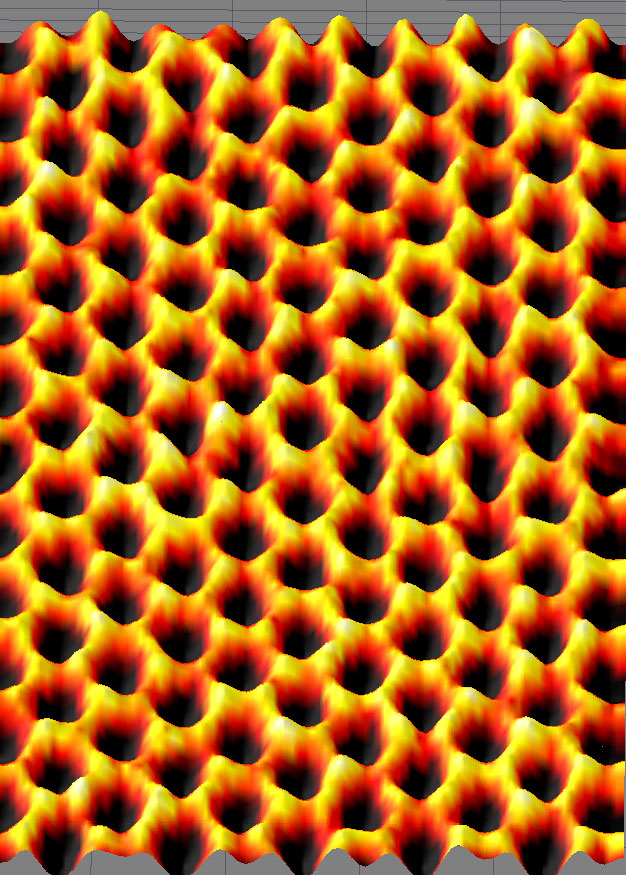
Scanning probe microscopy image of graphene

The hexagonal lattice structure of isolated, single-layer graphene can be directly seen with transmission electron microscopy (TEM) of sheets of graphene suspended between bars of a metallic grid. Some of these images showed a "rippling" of the flat sheet, with an amplitude of about one nanometer. These ripples may be intrinsic to the material as a result of the instability of two-dimensional crystals, or may originate from the ubiquitous dirt seen in all TEM images of graphene. Photoresist residue, which must be removed to obtain atomic-resolution images, may be the "adsorbates" observed in TEM images, and may explain the observed rippling.

The hexagonal structure is also seen in scanning tunneling microscope (STM) images of graphene supported on silicon dioxide substrates The rippling seen in these images is caused by the conformation of graphene to the substrates' lattice and is not intrinsic.

Atomic structure of graphene layer resting on the surface of hexagonal boron nitride can be visualised with atomic force microscope (AFM) in the ambient as well.

Atomic Force Microscopy image of carbon atoms in graphene imaged on NX1 AFM in ambient conditions

=== Stability ===
Ab initio calculations show that a graphene sheet is thermodynamically unstable if its size is less than about 20 nm and becomes the most stable fullerene (as within graphite) only for molecules larger than 24,000 atoms.

== Electronic properties ==
Electronic band structure of graphene. Valence and conduction bands meet at the six vertices of the hexagonal Brillouin zone and form linearly dispersing Dirac cones.

Graphene is a zero-gap semiconductor because its conduction and valence bands meet at the Dirac points. The Dirac points are six locations in momentum space on the edge of the Brillouin zone, divided into two non-equivalent sets of three points. These sets are labeled K and K'. These sets give graphene a valley degeneracy of $g_{v} = 2$. In contrast, for traditional semiconductors, the primary point of interest is generally Γ, where momentum is zero.

If the in-plane direction is confined rather than infinite, its electronic structure changes. These confined structures are referred to as graphene nanoribbons. If the nanoribbon has a "zig-zag" edge, the bandgap remains zero. If it has an "armchair" edge, the bandgap is non-zero.

Graphene's honeycomb structure can be viewed as two interleaving triangular lattices. This perspective has been used to calculate the band structure for a single graphite layer using a tight-binding approximation.

=== Electronic spectrum ===
Electrons propagating through the graphene honeycomb lattice effectively lose their mass, producing quasi-particles described by a 2D analogue of the Dirac equation rather than the Schrödinger equation for spin-1/2 particles.

=== Dispersion relation ===
Electronic band structure and Dirac cones, with effect of doping

The cleavage technique led directly to the first observation of the anomalous quantum Hall effect in graphene in 2005 by Geim's group and by Philip Kim and Yuanbo Zhang. This effect provided direct evidence of graphene's theoretically predicted Berry's phase of massless Dirac fermions and proof of the Dirac fermion nature of electrons. These effects were previously observed in bulk graphite by Yakov Kopelevich, Igor A. Luk'yanchuk, and others, in 2003–2004.

When atoms are placed onto the graphene hexagonal lattice, the overlap between the p_{z}(π) orbitals and the s or the p_{x} and p_{y} orbitals is zero by symmetry. Therefore, p_{z} electrons forming the π bands in graphene can be treated independently. Within this π-band approximation, using a conventional tight-binding model, the dispersion relation (restricted to first-nearest-neighbor interactions only) that produces the energy of the electrons with wave vector k is:

$$E(k_x,k_y)=\pm\,\gamma_0\sqrt{1+4\cos^2{\tfrac{1}{2}ak_x}+4\cos{\tfrac{1}{2}ak_x} \cdot \cos{\tfrac{\sqrt{3}}{2}ak_y}}$$

with the nearest-neighbor (π orbitals) hopping energy γ_{0} ≈ 2.8 eV and the lattice constant a ≈ 2.46 Å. The conduction and valence bands correspond to the different signs. With one p_{z} electron per atom in this model, the valence band is fully occupied, while the conduction band is vacant. The two bands touch at the zone corners (the K point in the Brillouin zone), where there is a zero density of states but no band gap. Thus, graphene exhibits a semi-metallic (or zero-gap semiconductor) character, although this is not true for a graphene sheet rolled into a carbon nanotube due to its curvature. Two of the six Dirac points are independent, while the rest are equivalent by symmetry. Near the K-points, the energy depends linearly on the wave vector, similar to a relativistic particle. Since an elementary cell of the lattice has a basis of two atoms, the wave function has an effective 2-spinor structure.

Consequently, at low energies even neglecting the true spin, electrons can be described by an equation formally equivalent to the massless Dirac equation. Hence, the electrons and holes are called Dirac fermions. This pseudo-relativistic description is restricted to the chiral limit, i.e., to vanishing rest mass M_{0}, leading to interesting additional features:

$$v_F\, \vec \sigma \cdot \nabla \psi(\mathbf{r})\,=\,E\psi(\mathbf{r}).$$

Here v_{F} ~ 10^{6} m/s (.003 c) is the Fermi velocity in graphene, which replaces the velocity of light in the Dirac theory; $\vec{\sigma}$ is the vector of the Pauli matrices, $\psi(\mathbf{r})$ is the two-component wave function of the electrons, and E is their energy.

The equation describing the electrons' linear dispersion relation is:

$$E(q)=\hbar v_F q$$

where the wavevector q is measured from the Brillouin zone vertex K, $q=\left|\mathbf{k}-\mathrm{K}\right|$, and the zero of energy is set to coincide with the Dirac point. The equation uses a pseudospin matrix formula that describes two sublattices of the honeycomb lattice.

=== Single-atom wave propagation ===
Electron waves in graphene propagate within a single-atom layer, making them sensitive to the proximity of other materials such as high-κ dielectrics, superconductors, and ferromagnets.

=== Ambipolar electron and hole transport ===
When the gate voltage in a field effect graphene device is changed from positive to negative, conduction switches from electrons to holes. The charge carrier concentration is proportional to the applied voltage. Graphene is neutral at zero gate voltage and resistivity is at its maximum because of the dearth of charge carriers. The rapid fall of resistivity when carriers are injected shows their high mobility, here of the order of 5000 cm^{2}/Vs. n-Si/SiO_{2} substrate, T=1K.

Graphene exhibits high electron mobility at room temperature, with values reported in excess of 15000 cm^{2}⋅V^{−1}⋅s^{−1}. Hole and electron mobilities are nearly identical. The mobility is independent of temperature between 10 K and 100 K, showing minimal change even at room temperature (300 K), suggesting that the dominant scattering mechanism is defect scattering. Scattering by graphene's acoustic phonons intrinsically limits room temperature mobility in freestanding graphene to 200000 cm^{2}⋅V^{−1}⋅s^{−1} at a carrier density of 10^{12} cm^{−2}.

The corresponding resistivity of graphene sheets is 10^{−8} Ω⋅m, lower than the resistivity of silver, which is the lowest known at room temperature. However, on SiO_{2} substrates, electron scattering by optical phonons of the substrate has a more significant effect than scattering by graphene's phonons, limiting mobility to 40000 cm^{2}⋅V^{−1}⋅s^{−1}.

Charge transport can be affected by the adsorption of contaminants such as water and oxygen molecules, leading to non-repetitive and large hysteresis I-V characteristics. Researchers need to conduct electrical measurements in a vacuum. Coating the graphene surface with materials such as SiN, PMMA or h-BN has been proposed for protection. In January 2015, the first stable graphene device operation in the air over several weeks was reported for graphene whose surface was protected by aluminum oxide. In 2015, lithium-coated graphene exhibited superconductivity, a first for graphene.

Electrical resistance in 40-nanometer-wide nanoribbons of epitaxial graphene changes in discrete steps. The ribbons' conductance exceeds predictions by a factor of 10. The ribbons can function more like optical waveguides or quantum dots, allowing electrons to flow smoothly along the ribbon edges. In copper, resistance increases proportionally with length as electrons encounter impurities.

Transport is dominated by two modes: one ballistic and temperature-independent, and the other thermally activated. Ballistic electrons resemble those in cylindrical carbon nanotubes. At room temperature, resistance increases abruptly at a specific length—the ballistic mode at 16 micrometers and the thermally activated mode at 160 nanometers (1% of the former length).

Graphene electrons can traverse micrometer distances without scattering, even at room temperature.

==== Electrical conductivity and charge transport ====
Despite zero carrier density near the Dirac points, graphene exhibits a minimum conductivity on the order of $4e^2/h$. The origin of this minimum conductivity is still unclear. However, rippling of the graphene sheet or ionized impurities in the SiO_{2} substrate may lead to local puddles of carriers that allow conduction. Several theories suggest that the minimum conductivity should be $4e^2/{(\pi}h)$; however, most measurements are of the order of $4e^2/h$ or greater and depend on impurity concentration.

Near zero carrier density, graphene exhibits positive photoconductivity and negative photoconductivity at high carrier density, governed by the interplay between photoinduced changes of both the Drude weight and the carrier scattering rate.

Graphene doped with various gaseous species (both acceptors and donors) can be returned to an undoped state by gentle heating in a vacuum. Even for dopant concentrations in excess of 10^{12} cm^{−2}, carrier mobility exhibits no observable change. Graphene doped with potassium in ultra-high vacuum at low temperature can reduce mobility 20-fold. The mobility reduction is reversible on heating the graphene to remove the potassium.

Due to graphene's two dimensions, charge fractionalization (where the apparent charge of individual pseudoparticles in low-dimensional systems is less than a single quantum) is thought to occur. It may therefore be a suitable material for constructing quantum computers using anyonic circuits.

=== Chiral half-integer quantum Hall effect ===
Landau levels in graphene appear at energies proportional to √N, in contrast to the standard sequence that goes as N + 1/2.

==== Quantum hall effect in graphene ====
The quantum Hall effect is a quantum mechanical version of the Hall effect, which is the production of transverse (perpendicular to the main current) conductivity in the presence of a magnetic field. The quantization of the Hall effect $\sigma_{xy}$ at integer multiples (the "Landau level") of the basic quantity e^{2}/h (where e is the elementary electric charge and h is the Planck constant). It can usually be observed only in very clean silicon or gallium arsenide solids at temperatures around 3 K and very high magnetic fields.

Graphene shows the quantum Hall effect: the conductivity quantization is unusual in that the sequence of steps is shifted by 1/2 with respect to the standard sequence and with an additional factor of 4. Graphene's Hall conductivity is $\sigma_{xy}=\pm {4\cdot\left(N + 1/2 \right)e^2}/h$, where N is the Landau level and the double valley and double spin degeneracies give the factor of 4. These anomalies are present not only at extremely low temperatures but also at room temperature, i.e. at roughly 20 °C (293 K).

==== Chiral electrons and anomalies ====
This behavior is a direct result of graphene's chiral, massless Dirac electrons. In a magnetic field, their spectrum has a Landau level with energy precisely at the Dirac point. This level is a consequence of the Atiyah–Singer index theorem and is half-filled in neutral graphene, leading to the "+1/2" in the Hall conductivity. Bilayer graphene also shows the quantum Hall effect, but with only one of the two anomalies (i.e. $\sigma_{xy}=\pm {4\cdot N\cdot e^2}/h$). In the second anomaly, the first plateau at N = 0 is absent, indicating that bilayer graphene stays metallic at the neutrality point.

Chiral half-integer quantum Hall effect in graphene. Plateaux in transverse conductivity appear at half-integer multiples of 4e^{2}/h.

Unlike normal metals, graphene's longitudinal resistance shows maxima rather than minima for integral values of the Landau filling factor in measurements of the Shubnikov–de Haas oscillations, thus the term "integral quantum Hall effect". These oscillations show a phase shift of π, known as Berry's phase. Berry's phase arises due to chirality or dependence (locking) of the pseudospin quantum number on the momentum of low-energy electrons near the Dirac points. The temperature dependence of the oscillations reveals that the carriers have a non-zero cyclotron mass, despite their zero effective mass in the Dirac-fermion formalism.

==== Experimental observations ====
Graphene samples prepared on nickel films, and on both the silicon face and carbon face of silicon carbide, show the anomalous effect directly in electrical measurements. Graphitic layers on the carbon face of silicon carbide show a clear Dirac spectrum in angle-resolved photoemission experiments, and the effect is observed in cyclotron resonance and tunneling experiments.

=== "Massive" electrons ===
Graphene's unit cell has two identical carbon atoms and two zero-energy states: one where the electron resides on atom A, and the other on atom B. However, if the unit cell's two atoms are not identical, the situation changes. Research shows that placing hexagonal boron nitride (h-BN) in contact with graphene can alter the potential felt at atoms A and B sufficiently for the electrons to develop a mass and an accompanying band gap of about 30 meV.

The mass can be positive or negative. An arrangement that slightly raises the energy of an electron on atom A relative to atom B gives it a positive mass, while an arrangement that raises the energy of atom B produces a negative electron mass. The two versions behave alike and are indistinguishable via optical spectroscopy. An electron traveling from a positive-mass region to a negative-mass region must cross an intermediate region where its mass once again becomes zero. This region is gapless and therefore metallic. Metallic modes bounding semiconducting regions of opposite-sign mass is a hallmark of a topological phase and displays much the same physics as topological insulators.

If the mass in graphene can be controlled, electrons can be confined to massless regions by surrounding them with massive regions, allowing the patterning of quantum dots, wires, and other mesoscopic structures. It also produces one-dimensional conductors along the boundary. These wires would be protected against backscattering and could carry currents without dissipation.

=== Inertial effect and kinetic inductance ===
While a single electron exhibits zero effective mass in graphene, as the entire set of electrons is moved with an electric field, the Fermi disk shifts, with both the total kinetic energy $E$ and the magnitude of the total momentum $P$ being increased. Since $E$ is minimum when $P = 0$, to the first order, $E \sim P^2$ must hold. The proportional constant must be given by $1/(2M)$ where $M$ is the collective mass (inertia) of graphene electrons. Another view of this is to associate the total kinetic energy with the current. Because the total momentum is proportional to the current $I$, $E \sim I^2$ must hold. The proportional constant must be given by $(1/2)L_k$, where $L_k$ is a quantity of inductance unit, but its origin is not the Faraday induction but the inertial effect. $L_k$ is the graphene kinetic inductance, and is given by $L_K=(\pi\hbar^2)/(e^2 \epsilon_F W)$ per unit length for a graphene strip with a width $W$ ($\epsilon_F$ is the Fermi energy). The kinetic inductance, representing the collective inertial effect, is intimately linked to graphene plasmonics, and was directly measured via microwave network analysis in 2014.

== Interactions and phenomena ==
=== Strong magnetic fields ===
In magnetic fields above 10 tesla, additional plateaus of the Hall conductivity at σ_{xy} = νe^{2}/h with ν = 0, ±1, ±4 are observed. A plateau at ν = 3 and the fractional quantum Hall effect at ν = 1/3 were also reported.

These observations with ν = 0, ±1, ±3, ±4 indicate that the four-fold degeneracy (two valley and two spin degrees of freedom) of the Landau energy levels is partially or completely lifted.

=== Casimir effect ===
The Casimir effect is an interaction between disjoint neutral bodies provoked by the fluctuations of the electromagnetic vacuum. Mathematically, it can be explained by considering the normal modes of electromagnetic fields, which explicitly depend on the boundary conditions on the interacting bodies' surfaces. Due to graphene's strong interaction with the electromagnetic field as a one-atom-thick material, the Casimir effect has garnered significant interest.

=== Van der Waals force ===
The Van der Waals force (or dispersion force) is also unusual, obeying an inverse cubic asymptotic power law in contrast to the usual inverse quartic law.

=== Permittivity ===
Graphene's permittivity varies with frequency. Over a range from microwave to millimeter wave frequencies, it is approximately 3.3. This permittivity, combined with its ability to function as both a conductor and as an insulator, theoretically allows compact capacitors made of graphene to store large amounts of electrical energy.

== Optical properties ==
Graphene exhibits unique optical properties, showing unexpectedly high opacity for an atomic monolayer in vacuum, absorbing approximately πα ≈ 2.3% of light from visible to infrared wavelengths, where α is the fine-structure constant. This is due to the unusual low-energy electronic structure of monolayer graphene, characterized by electron and hole conical bands meeting at the Dirac point, which is qualitatively different from more common quadratic massive bands. Based on the Slonczewski–Weiss–McClure (SWMcC) band model of graphite, calculations using Fresnel equations in the thin-film limit account for interatomic distance, hopping values, and frequency, thus assessing optical conductance.

Experimental verification, though confirmed, lacks the precision required to improve upon existing techniques for determining the fine-structure constant.

=== Multi-parametric surface plasmon resonance ===
Multi-parametric surface plasmon resonance has been utilized to characterize both the thickness and refractive index of chemical-vapor-deposition (CVD)-grown graphene films. At a wavelength of 670 nm (6.7×10^{−7} m), measured refractive index and extinction coefficient values are 3.135 and 0.897, respectively. Thickness determination yielded 3.7 Å across a 0.5mm area, consistent with the 3.35 Å reported for layer-to-layer carbon atom distance of graphite crystals. This method is applicable for real-time label-free interactions of graphene with organic and inorganic substances. The existence of unidirectional surface plasmons in nonreciprocal graphene-based gyrotropic interfaces has been theoretically demonstrated, offering tunability from THz to near-infrared and visible frequencies by controlling graphene's chemical potential. Particularly, the unidirectional frequency bandwidth can be 1– 2 orders of magnitude larger than that achievable with metal under similar magnetic field conditions, stemming from graphene's extremely small effective electron mass.

=== Tunable band gap and optical response ===
Graphene's band gap can be tuned from 0 to 0.25 eV (about 5-micrometer wavelength) by applying a voltage to a dual-gate bilayer graphene field-effect transistor (FET) at room temperature. The optical response of graphene nanoribbons is tunable into the terahertz regime by an applied magnetic fields. Graphene/graphene oxide systems exhibit electrochromic behavior, enabling tuning of both linear and ultrafast optical properties.

=== Graphene-based Bragg grating ===
A graphene-based Bragg grating (one-dimensional photonic crystal) has been fabricated, demonstrating its capability to excite surface electromagnetic waves in periodic structure using a 633 nm (6.33×10^{−7} m) He–Ne laser as the light source.

=== Saturable absorption ===
Graphene exhibits unique saturable absorption, which saturates when the input optical intensity exceeds a threshold value. This nonlinear optical behavior, termed saturable absorption, occurs across the visible to near-infrared spectrum, due to graphene's universal optical absorption and zero band gap. This property has enabled full-band mode-locking in fiber lasers using graphene-based saturable absorbers, contributing significantly to ultrafast photonics. Additionally, the optical response of graphene/graphene oxide layers can be electrically tuned.

Saturable absorption in graphene could occur at the Microwave and Terahertz band, owing to its wideband optical absorption property. The microwave-saturable absorption in graphene demonstrates the possibility of graphene microwaves and terahertz photonics devices, such as a microwave-saturable absorber, modulator, polarizer, microwave signal processing, and broadband wireless access networks.

=== Nonlinear Kerr effect ===
Under intense laser illumination, graphene exhibits a nonlinear phase shift due to the optical nonlinear Kerr effect. Graphene demonstrates a large nonlinear Kerr coefficient of 10^{−7} cm^{2}⋅W^{−1}, nearly nine orders of magnitude larger than that of bulk dielectrics, suggesting its potential as a powerful nonlinear Kerr medium capable of supporting various nonlinear effects, including solitons.

== Excitonic properties ==
First-principle calculations incorporating quasiparticle corrections and many-body effects have been employed to study the electronic and optical properties of graphene-based materials. The approach was described as three stages. With GW calculation, the properties of graphene-based materials were accurately investigated, including bulk graphene, nanoribbons, edge and surface functionalized armchair ribbons, hydrogen saturated armchair ribbons, Josephson effect in graphene SNS junctions with single localized defect and armchair ribbon scaling properties.

=== Spin transport ===
Graphene is considered an ideal material for spintronics due to its minimal spin–orbit interaction, the near absence of nuclear magnetic moments in carbon, and weak hyperfine interaction. Electrical injection and detection of spin current have been demonstrated up to room temperature, with spin coherence length exceeding 1 micrometer observed at this temperature. Control of spin current polarity via electrical gating has been achieved at low temperatures.

== Magnetic properties ==
=== Strong magnetic fields ===
Graphene's quantum Hall effect in magnetic fields above approximately 10 tesla reveals additional interesting features. Additional plateaus in Hall conductivity at $\sigma_{xy}=\nu e^2/h$ with $\nu=0,\pm {1},\pm {4}$ have been observed, along with plateau at $\nu=3$ and a fractional quantum Hall effect at $\nu=1/3$.

These observations with $\nu=0,\pm 1,\pm 3, \pm 4$ indicate that the four-fold degeneracy (two valley and two spin degrees of freedom) of the Landau energy levels is partially or completely lifted. One hypothesis proposes that magnetic catalysis of symmetry breaking is responsible for this degeneracy lift.

=== Spintronic properties ===
Graphene exhibits spintronic and magnetic properties concurrently. Low-defect graphene Nano-meshes, fabricated using a non-lithographic approach, exhibit significant ferromagnetism even at room temperature. Additionally, a spin pumping effect has been observed with fields applied in parallel to the planes of few-layer ferromagnetic nano-meshes, while a magnetoresistance hysteresis loop is evident under perpendicular fields. Charge-neutral graphene has demonstrated magnetoresistance exceeding 100% in magnetic fields generated by standard permanent magnets (approximately 0.1 tesla), marking a record magneto resistivity at room temperature among known materials.

=== Magnetic substrates ===
In 2010, researchers magnetized graphene by producing it via CVD on the Ni(111) substrate and then in 2014 by placing it on an atomically smooth layer of magnetic yttrium iron garnet, maintaining graphene's electronic properties unaffected. Previous methods involved doping graphene with other substances. The dopant's presence negatively affected its electronic properties.

== Mechanical properties ==
As noted above, the (two-dimensional) density of graphene is 0.762 mg per square meter.

Graphene is the strongest material ever tested, with an intrinsic tensile strength of 130 GPa (19,000,000 psi) (with representative engineering tensile strength ~50-60 GPa for stretching large-area freestanding graphene) and a Young's modulus (stiffness) close to 1 TPa (150,000,000 psi). The Nobel announcement illustrated this by saying that a 1 square meter graphene hammock would support a 4 kg cat but would weigh only as much as one of the cat's whiskers, at 0.77 mg (about 0.001% of the weight of 1 m^{2} of paper).

Large-angle bending of graphene monolayers with minimal strain demonstrates its mechanical robustness. Even under extreme deformation, monolayer graphene maintains excellent carrier mobility.

The spring constant of suspended graphene sheets has been measured using an atomic force microscope (AFM). Graphene sheets were suspended over SiO_{2} cavities where an AFM tip was used to apply stress to the sheet to test its mechanical properties. Its spring constant was in the range 1–5 N/m and the stiffness was 0.5 TPa, which differs from that of bulk graphite. These intrinsic properties could lead to applications such as NEMS as pressure sensors and resonators. Due to its large surface energy and out of plane ductility, flat graphene sheets are unstable with respect to scrolling, i.e. bending into a cylindrical shape, which is its lower-energy state.

In two-dimensional structures like graphene, thermal and quantum fluctuations cause relative displacement, with fluctuations growing logarithmically with structure size as per the Mermin–Wagner theorem. This shows that the amplitude of long-wavelength fluctuations grows logarithmically with the scale of a 2D structure, and would therefore be unbounded in structures of infinite size. Local deformation and elastic strain are negligibly affected by this long-range divergence in relative displacement. It is believed that a sufficiently large 2D structure, in the absence of applied lateral tension, will bend and crumple to form a fluctuating 3D structure. Researchers have observed ripples in suspended layers of graphene, and it has been proposed that the ripples are caused by thermal fluctuations in the material. As a consequence of these dynamical deformations, it is debatable whether graphene is truly a 2D structure. These ripples, when amplified by vacancy defects, induce a negative Poisson's ratio into graphene, resulting in the thinnest auxetic material known so far.

Graphene-nickel (Ni) composites, created through plating processes, exhibit enhanced mechanical properties due to strong Ni-graphene interactions inhibiting dislocation sliding in the Ni matrix.

=== Fracture toughness ===
In 2014, researchers from Rice University and the Georgia Institute of Technology have indicated that despite its strength, graphene is also relatively brittle, with a fracture toughness of about 4 MPa√m. This indicates that imperfect graphene is likely to crack in a brittle manner like ceramic materials, as opposed to many metallic materials which tend to have fracture toughness in the range of 15–50 MPa√m. Later in 2014, the Rice team announced that graphene showed a greater ability to distribute force from an impact than any known material, ten times that of steel per unit weight. The force was transmitted at 22.2 kilometres per second (13.8 mi/s).

=== Polycrystalline graphene ===
Various methods – most notably, chemical vapor deposition (CVD), as discussed in the section below – have been developed to produce large-scale graphene needed for device applications. Such methods often synthesize polycrystalline graphene. The mechanical properties of polycrystalline graphene are affected by the nature of the defects, such as grain-boundaries (GB) and vacancies, present in the system and the average grain-size.

Graphene grain boundaries typically contain heptagon-pentagon pairs. The arrangement of such defects depends on whether the GB is in a zig-zag or armchair direction. It further depends on the tilt-angle of the GB. In 2010, researchers from Brown University computationally predicted that as the tilt-angle increases, the grain boundary strength also increases. They showed that the weakest link in the grain boundary is at the critical bonds of the heptagon rings. As the grain boundary angle increases, the strain in these heptagon rings decreases, causing the grain boundary to be stronger than lower-angle GBs. They proposed that, in fact, for sufficiently large angle GB, the strength of the GB is similar to pristine graphene. In 2012, it was further shown that the strength can increase or decrease, depending on the detailed arrangements of the defects. These predictions have since been supported by experimental evidence. In a 2013 study led by James Hone's group, researchers probed the elastic stiffness and strength of CVD-grown graphene by combining nano-indentation and high-resolution TEM. They found that the elastic stiffness is identical and strength is only slightly lower than those in pristine graphene. In the same year, researchers from University of California, Berkeley and University of California, Los Angeles probed bi-crystalline graphene with TEM and AFM. They found that the strength of grain boundaries indeed tends to increase with the tilt angle.

While the presence of vacancies is not only prevalent in polycrystalline graphene, vacancies can have significant effects on the strength of graphene. The consensus is that the strength decreases along with increasing densities of vacancies. Various studies have shown that for graphene with a sufficiently low density of vacancies, the strength does not vary significantly from that of pristine graphene. On the other hand, a high density of vacancies can severely reduce the strength of graphene.

Compared to the fairly well-understood nature of the effect that grain boundary and vacancies have on the mechanical properties of graphene, there is no clear consensus on the general effect that the average grain size has on the strength of polycrystalline graphene. In fact, three notable theoretical or computational studies on this topic have led to three different conclusions. First, in 2012, Kolakowski and Myer studied the mechanical properties of polycrystalline graphene with "realistic atomistic model", using molecular-dynamics (MD) simulation. To emulate the growth mechanism of CVD, they first randomly selected nucleation sites that are at least 5A (arbitrarily chosen) apart from other sites. Polycrystalline graphene was generated from these nucleation sites and was subsequently annealed at 3000K, and then quenched. Based on this model, they found that cracks are initiated at grain-boundary junctions, but the grain size does not significantly affect the strength. Second, in 2013, Z. Song et al. used MD simulations to study the mechanical properties of polycrystalline graphene with uniform-sized hexagon-shaped grains. The hexagon grains were oriented in various lattice directions and the GBs consisted of only heptagon, pentagon, and hexagonal carbon rings. The motivation behind such a model was that similar systems had been experimentally observed in graphene flakes grown on the surface of liquid copper. While they also noted that crack is typically initiated at the triple junctions, they found that as the grain size decreases, the yield strength of graphene increases. Based on this finding, they proposed that polycrystalline follows pseudo Hall-Petch relationship. Third, in 2013, Z. D. Sha et al. studied the effect of grain size on the properties of polycrystalline graphene, by modeling the grain patches using Voronoi construction. The GBs in this model consisted of heptagons, pentagons, and hexagons, as well as squares, octagons, and vacancies. Through MD simulation, contrary to the aforementioned study, they found an inverse Hall-Petch relationship, where the strength of graphene increases as the grain size increases. Experimental observations and other theoretical predictions also gave differing conclusions, similar to the three given above. Such discrepancies show the complexity of the effects that grain size, arrangements of defects, and the nature of defects have on the mechanical properties of polycrystalline graphene.

== Other properties ==
=== Thermal conductivity ===
Thermal transport in graphene is a burgeoning area of research, particularly for its potential applications in thermal management. Most experimental measurements have posted large uncertainties in the results of thermal conductivity due to the limitations of the instruments used. Following predictions for graphene and related carbon nanotubes, early measurements of the thermal conductivity of suspended graphene reported an exceptionally large thermal conductivity up to 5300 W⋅m^{−1}⋅K^{−1}, compared with the thermal conductivity of pyrolytic graphite of approximately 2000 W⋅m^{−1}⋅K^{−1} at room temperature. However, later studies primarily on more scalable but more defected graphene derived by Chemical Vapor Deposition have been unable to reproduce such high thermal conductivity measurements, producing a wide range of thermal conductivities between 1500 – 2500 W⋅m^{−1}⋅K^{−1} for suspended single-layer graphene. The large range in the reported thermal conductivity can be caused by large measurement uncertainties as well as variations in the graphene quality and processing conditions. In addition, it is known that when single-layer graphene is supported on an amorphous material, the thermal conductivity is reduced to about 500 – 600 W⋅m^{−1}⋅K^{−1} at room temperature as a result of scattering of graphene lattice waves by the substrate, and can be even lower for few-layer graphene encased in amorphous oxide. Likewise, polymeric residue can contribute to a similar decrease in the thermal conductivity of suspended graphene to approximately 500 – 600 W⋅m^{−1}⋅K^{−1} for bilayer graphene.

Isotopic composition, specifically the ratio of ^{12}C to ^{13}C, significantly affects graphene's thermal conductivity. Isotopically pure ^{12}C graphene exhibits higher thermal conductivity than either a 50:50 isotope ratio or the naturally occurring 99:1 ratio. It can be shown by using the Wiedemann–Franz law, that the thermal conduction is phonon-dominated. However, for a gated graphene strip, an applied gate bias causing a Fermi energy shift much larger than k_{B}T can cause the electronic contribution to increase and dominate over the phonon contribution at low temperatures. The ballistic thermal conductance of graphene is isotropic.

Graphite, a 3D counterpart to graphene, exhibits a basal plane thermal conductivity exceeding 1000 W⋅m^{−1}⋅K^{−1} (similar to diamond), In graphite, the c-axis (out of plane) thermal conductivity is over a factor of ~100 smaller due to the weak binding forces between basal planes as well as the larger lattice spacing. In addition, the ballistic thermal conductance of graphene is shown to give the lower limit of the ballistic thermal conductance, per unit circumference, length of carbon nanotubes.

Graphene's thermal conductivity is influenced by its three acoustic phonon modes: two linear dispersion relation in-plane modes (LA, TA) and one quadratic dispersion relation out-of-plane mode (ZA). At low temperatures, the dominance of the T^{1.5} thermal conductivity contribution of the out-of-plane mode supersedes the T^{2} dependence of the linear modes. Some graphene phonon bands exhibit negative Grüneisen parameters, resulting in negative thermal expansion coefficient at low temperatures. The lowest negative Grüneisen parameters correspond to the lowest transverse acoustic ZA modes, whose frequencies increase with in-plane lattice parameter, akin to a stretched string with higher frequency vibrations.

=== Chemical properties ===
Graphene has a theoretical specific surface area (SSA) of 2630 m^{2}/g. This is much larger than that reported to date for carbon black (typically smaller than 900 m^{2}/g) or for carbon nanotubes (CNTs), from ≈100 to 1000 m^{2}/g and is similar to activated carbon. Graphene is the only form of carbon (or solid material) in which every atom is available for chemical reaction from two sides (due to the 2D structure). Atoms at the edges of a graphene sheet have special chemical reactivity. Graphene has the highest ratio of edge atoms of any allotrope. Defects within a sheet increase its chemical reactivity. The onset temperature of reaction between the basal plane of single-layer graphene and oxygen gas is below 260 °C (530 K). Graphene burns at very low temperatures (e.g., 350 °C (620 K)). Graphene is commonly modified with oxygen- and nitrogen-containing functional groups and analyzed by infrared spectroscopy and X-ray photoelectron spectroscopy. However, the determination of structures of graphene with oxygen- and nitrogen- functional groups require the structures to be well controlled.

In 2013, Stanford University physicists reported that single-layer graphene is a hundred times more chemically reactive than thicker multilayer sheets.

Graphene can self-repair holes in its sheets, when exposed to molecules containing carbon, such as hydrocarbons. Bombarded with pure carbon atoms, the atoms perfectly align into hexagons, filling the holes.

=== Biological properties ===
Despite the promising results in different cell studies and proof of concept studies, there is still incomplete understanding of the full biocompatibility of graphene-based materials. Different cell lines react differently when exposed to graphene, and it has been shown that the lateral size of the graphene flakes, the form and surface chemistry can elicit different biological responses on the same cell line.

There are indications that graphene has promise as a useful material for interacting with neural cells; studies on cultured neural cells show limited success.

Graphene also has some utility in osteogenesis. Researchers at the Graphene Research Centre at the National University of Singapore (NUS) discovered in 2011 the ability of graphene to accelerate the osteogenic differentiation of human mesenchymal stem cells without the use of biochemical inducers.

Graphene can be used in biosensors; in 2015, researchers demonstrated that a graphene-based sensor can be used to detect a cancer risk biomarker. In particular, by using epitaxial graphene on silicon carbide, they were repeatedly able to detect 8-hydroxydeoxyguanosine (8-OHdG), a DNA damage biomarker.

=== Support substrate ===
The electronic property of graphene can be significantly influenced by the supporting substrate. Studies of graphene monolayers on clean and hydrogen(H)-passivated silicon (100) (Si(100)/H) surfaces have been performed. The Si(100)/H surface does not perturb the electronic properties of graphene, whereas the interaction between the clean Si(100) surface and graphene changes the electronic states of graphene significantly. This effect results from the covalent bonding between C and surface Si atoms, modifying the π-orbital network of the graphene layer. The local density of states shows that the bonded C and Si surface states are highly disturbed near the Fermi energy.

== Graphene layers and structural variants ==
=== Monolayer sheets ===
In 2013 a group of Polish scientists presented a production unit that allows the manufacture of continuous monolayer sheets. The process is based on graphene growth on a liquid metal matrix. The product of this process was called High Strength Metallurgical Graphene. In a new study published in Nature, the researchers have used a single-layer graphene electrode and a novel surface-sensitive non-linear spectroscopy technique to investigate the top-most water layer at the electrochemically charged surface. They found that the interfacial water response to the applied electric field is asymmetric concerning the nature of the applied field.

=== Bilayer graphene ===
Bilayer graphene displays the anomalous quantum Hall effect, a tunable band gap and potential for excitonic condensation –making it a promising candidate for optoelectronic and nanoelectronic applications. Bilayer graphene typically can be found either in twisted configurations where the two layers are rotated relative to each other or graphitic Bernal stacked configurations where half the atoms in one layer lie atop half the atoms in the other. Stacking order and orientation govern the optical and electronic properties of bilayer graphene.

One way to synthesize bilayer graphene is via chemical vapor deposition, which can produce large bilayer regions that almost exclusively conform to a Bernal stack geometry.

It has been shown that the two graphene layers can withstand important strain or doping mismatch which ultimately should lead to their exfoliation.

=== Trilayer graphene ===
Trilayer graphene can be twisted or Bernal stacked, or it can be stacked as rhombohedral graphene, where half the atoms in the third layer sit above the two halves of the atoms in the first and second layer which are not aligned with each other, forming an ABC structure. Superconductivity has been shown to be electrically tunable in the rhombohedral stacking.

=== Turbostratic ===
Turbostratic graphene exhibits weak interlayer coupling, and the spacing is increased with respect to Bernal-stacked multilayer graphene. Rotational misalignment preserves the 2D electronic structure, as confirmed by Raman spectroscopy. The D peak is very weak, whereas the 2D and G peaks remain prominent.

A rather peculiar feature is that the I_{2D}/I_{G} ratio can exceed 10. However, most importantly, the M peak, which originates from AB stacking, is absent, whereas the TS_{1} and TS_{2} modes are visible in the Raman spectrum. The material is formed through conversion of non-graphenic carbon into graphenic carbon without providing sufficient energy to allow for the reorganization through annealing of adjacent graphene layers into crystalline graphitic structures.

=== Graphene superlattices ===
Periodically stacked graphene and its insulating isomorph provide a fascinating structural element in implementing highly functional superlattices at the atomic scale, which offers possibilities for designing nanoelectronic and photonic devices. Various types of superlattices can be obtained by stacking graphene and its related forms. The energy band in layer-stacked superlattices is found to be more sensitive to the barrier width than that in conventional III–V semiconductor superlattices. When adding more than one atomic layer to the barrier in each period, the coupling of electronic wavefunctions in neighboring potential wells can be significantly reduced, which leads to the degeneration of continuous subbands into quantized energy levels. When varying the well width, the energy levels in the potential wells along the L-M direction behave distinctly from those along the K-H direction.

A superlattice corresponds to a periodic or quasi-periodic arrangement of different materials and can be described by a superlattice period which confers a new translational symmetry to the system, impacting their phonon dispersions and subsequently their thermal transport properties. Recently, uniform monolayer graphene-hBN structures have been successfully synthesized via lithography patterning coupled with chemical vapor deposition (CVD). Furthermore, superlattices of graphene-HBN are ideal model systems for the realization and understanding of coherent (wave-like) and incoherent (particle-like) phonon thermal transport.

== Nanostructured graphene forms ==
=== Graphene nanoribbons ===
Names for graphene edge topologies

GNR Electronic band structure of graphene strips of varying widths in zig-zag orientation. Tight-binding calculations show that they are all metallic.

GNR Electronic band structure of graphene strips of various widths in the armchair orientation. Tight-binding calculations show that they are semiconducting or metallic depending on width (chirality).

Graphene nanoribbons ("nanostripes" in the "zig-zag"/"zigzag" orientation), at low temperatures, show spin-polarized metallic edge currents, which also suggests applications in the new field of spintronics. (In the "armchair" orientation, the edges behave like semiconductors.)

=== Graphene quantum dots ===
A graphene quantum dot (GQD) is a graphene fragment with a size less than 100 nm. The properties of GQDs are different from bulk graphene due to the quantum confinement effects which only become apparent when the size is smaller than 100 nm.

== Modified and functionalized graphene ==
=== Graphene oxide ===
Graphene oxide is usually produced through chemical exfoliation of graphite. A particularly popular technique is the improved Hummers' method. Using paper-making techniques on dispersed, oxidized and chemically processed graphite in water, the monolayer flakes form a single sheet and create strong bonds. These sheets, called graphene oxide paper, have a measured tensile modulus of 32 GPa. The chemical property of graphite oxide is related to the functional groups attached to graphene sheets. These can change the polymerization pathway and similar chemical processes. Graphene oxide flakes in polymers display enhanced photo-conducting properties. Graphene is normally hydrophobic and impermeable to all gases and liquids (vacuum-tight). However, when formed into a graphene oxide-based capillary membrane, both liquid water and water vapor flow through as quickly as if the membrane were not present.

In 2022, researchers evaluated the biological effects of low doses on graphene oxide on larvae and imago of Drosophila melanogaster. Results show that oral administration of graphene oxide at concentrations of 0.02-1% has a beneficial effect on the developmental rate and hatching ability of larvae. Long-term administration of a low dose of graphene oxide extends the lifespan of Drosophila and significantly enhances resistance to environmental stresses. These suggest that graphene oxide affects carbohydrate and lipid metabolism in adult Drosophila. These findings might provide a useful reference to assess the biological effects of graphene oxide, which could play an important role in a variety of graphene-based biomedical applications.

=== Chemical modification ===
Photograph of single-layer graphene oxide undergoing high temperature chemical treatment, resulting in sheet folding and loss of carboxylic functionality, or through room temperature carbodiimide treatment, collapsing into star-like clusters.

Soluble fragments of graphene can be prepared in the laboratory through chemical modification of graphite. First, microcrystalline graphite is treated with an acidic mixture of sulfuric acid and nitric acid. A series of oxidation and exfoliation steps produce small graphene plates with carboxyl groups at their edges. These are converted to acid chloride groups by treatment with thionyl chloride; next, they are converted to the corresponding graphene amide via treatment with octadecyl amine. The resulting material (circular graphene layers of 5.3 Å or 5.3×10^{−10} m thickness) is soluble in tetrahydrofuran, tetrachloromethane and dichloroethane.

Refluxing single-layer graphene oxide (SLGO) in solvents leads to size reduction and folding of individual sheets as well as loss of carboxylic group functionality, by up to 20%, indicating thermal instabilities of SLGO sheets dependent on their preparation methodology. When using thionyl chloride, acyl chloride groups result, which can then form aliphatic and aromatic amides with a reactivity conversion of around 70–80%.

Boehm titration results for various chemical reactions of single-layer graphene oxide, which reveal reactivity of the carboxylic groups and the resultant stability of the SLGO sheets after treatment.

Hydrazine reflux is commonly used for reducing SLGO to SLG(R), but titrations show that only around 20–30% of the carboxylic groups are lost, leaving a significant number available for chemical attachment. Analysis of SLG(R) generated by this route reveals that the system is unstable and using a room temperature stirring with hydrochloric acid (< 1.0 M) leads to around 60% loss of COOH functionality. Room temperature treatment of SLGO with carbodiimides leads to the collapse of the individual sheets into star-like clusters that exhibited poor subsequent reactivity with amines (c. 3–5% conversion of the intermediate to the final amide). It is apparent that conventional chemical treatment of carboxylic groups on SLGO generates morphological changes of individual sheets that leads to a reduction in chemical reactivity, which may potentially limit their use in composite synthesis. Therefore, chemical reaction types have been explored. SLGO has also been grafted with polyallylamine, cross-linked through epoxy groups. When filtered into graphene oxide paper, these composites exhibit increased stiffness and strength relative to unmodified graphene oxide paper.

Full hydrogenation from both sides of the graphene sheet results in Graphane, but partial hydrogenation leads to hydrogenated graphene. Similarly, both-side fluorination of graphene (or chemical and mechanical exfoliation of graphite fluoride) leads to fluorographene (graphene fluoride), while partial fluorination (generally halogenation) provides fluorinated (halogenated) graphene.

=== Graphene ligand/complex ===
Graphene can be a ligand to coordinate metals and metal ions by introducing functional groups. Structures of graphene ligands are similar to e.g. metal-porphyrin complex, metal-phthalocyanine complex, and metal-phenanthroline complex. Copper and nickel ions can be coordinated with graphene ligands.

== Advanced graphene structures ==
=== Graphene fiber ===
In 2011, researchers reported a novel yet simple approach to fabricating graphene fibers from chemical vapor deposition-grown graphene films. The method was scalable and controllable, delivering tunable morphology and pore structure by controlling the evaporation of solvents with suitable surface tension. Flexible all-solid-state supercapacitors based on these graphene fibers were demonstrated in 2013.

In 2015, researchers intercalated small graphene fragments into the gaps formed by larger, coiled graphene sheets. They found that after annealing, this provided pathways for conduction, while the fragments helped reinforce the fibers. The resulting fibers offered better thermal and electrical conductivity and mechanical strength. Thermal conductivity reached 1,290 W/m/K (1,290 watts per metre per kelvin), while tensile strength reached 1,080 MPa (157,000 psi).

In 2016, kilometer-scale continuous graphene fibers with outstanding mechanical properties and excellent electrical conductivity were produced by high-throughput wet-spinning of graphene oxide liquid crystals followed by graphitization through a full-scale synergetic defect-engineering strategy. The graphene fibers with superior performances promise wide applications in functional textiles, lightweight motors, microelectronic devices, etc.

Tsinghua University in Beijing, led by Wei Fei of the Department of Chemical Engineering, claims to be able to create a carbon nanotube fiber that has a tensile strength of 80 GPa (12,000,000 psi).

=== 3D graphene ===
In 2013, a three-dimensional honeycomb of hexagonally arranged carbon was termed 3D graphene, and self-supporting 3D graphene was also produced. 3D structures of graphene can be fabricated by using either CVD or solution-based methods. A 2016 review by Khurram and Xu et al. provided a summary of then-state-of-the-art techniques for fabrication of the 3D structure of graphene and other related two-dimensional materials. In 2013, researchers at Stony Brook University reported a novel radical-initiated crosslinking method to fabricate porous 3D free-standing architectures of graphene and carbon nanotubes using nanomaterials as building blocks without any polymer matrix as support. These 3D graphenes (all-carbon) scaffolds/foams have applications in several fields such as energy storage, filtration, thermal management, and biomedical devices and implants.

Box-shaped graphene (BSG) nanostructure appearing after mechanical cleavage of pyrolytic graphite was reported in 2016. The discovered nanostructure is a multilayer system of parallel hollow nanochannels located along the surface and having quadrangular cross-section. The thickness of the channel walls is approximately equal to 1 nm. Potential fields of BSG application include ultra-sensitive detectors, high-performance catalytic cells, nanochannels for DNA sequencing and manipulation, high-performance heat sinking surfaces, rechargeable batteries of enhanced performance, nanomechanical resonators, electron multiplication channels in emission Nano-electronic devices, high-capacity sorbents for safe hydrogen storage.

Three dimensional bilayer graphene has also been reported.

=== Pillared graphene ===
Pillared graphene is a hybrid carbon structure, consisting of an oriented array of carbon nanotubes connected at each end to a sheet of graphene. It was first described theoretically by George Froudakis and colleagues at the University of Crete in Greece in 2008. Pillared graphene has not yet been synthesized in the laboratory, but it has been suggested that it may have useful electronic properties, or as a hydrogen storage material.

=== Reinforced graphene ===
Graphene reinforced with embedded carbon nanotube reinforcing bars ("rebar") is easier to manipulate, while improving the electrical and mechanical qualities of both materials.

Functionalized single- or multi-walled carbon nanotubes are spin-coated on copper foils and then heated and cooled, using the nanotubes themselves as the carbon source. Under heating, the functional carbon groups decompose into graphene, while the nanotubes partially split and form in-plane covalent bonds with the graphene, adding strength. π–π stacking domains add more strength. The nanotubes can overlap, making the material a better conductor than standard CVD-grown graphene. The nanotubes effectively bridge the grain boundaries found in conventional graphene. The technique eliminates the traces of substrate on which later-separated sheets were deposited using epitaxy.

Stacks of a few layers have been proposed as a cost-effective and physically flexible replacement for indium tin oxide (ITO) used in displays and photovoltaic cells.

=== Molded graphene ===
In 2015, researchers from the University of Illinois at Urbana–Champaign (UIUC) developed a new approach for forming 3D shapes from flat, 2D sheets of graphene. A film of graphene that had been soaked in solvent to make it swell and become malleable was overlaid on an underlying substrate "former". The solvent evaporated over time, leaving behind a layer of graphene that had taken on the shape of the underlying structure. In this way, they were able to produce a range of relatively intricate micro-structured shapes. Features vary from 3.5 to 50 μm. Pure graphene and gold-decorated graphene were each successfully integrated with the substrate.

== Specialized graphene configurations ==
=== Graphene aerogel ===
An aerogel made of graphene layers separated by carbon nanotubes was measured at 0.16 milligrams per cubic centimeter. A solution of graphene and carbon nanotubes in a mold is freeze-dried to dehydrate the solution, leaving the aerogel. The material has superior elasticity and absorption. It can recover completely after more than 90% compression, and absorb up to 900 times its weight in oil, at a rate of 68.8 grams per second.

=== Graphene nanocoil ===
In 2015, a coiled form of graphene was discovered in graphitic carbon (coal). The spiraling effect is produced by defects in the material's hexagonal grid that causes it to spiral along its edge, mimicking a Riemann surface, with the graphene surface approximately perpendicular to the axis. When voltage is applied to such a coil, current flows around the spiral, producing a magnetic field. The phenomenon applies to spirals with either zigzag or armchair patterns, although with different current distributions. Computer simulations indicated that a conventional spiral inductor of 205 microns in diameter could be matched by a nanocoil just 70 nanometers wide, with a field strength reaching as much as 1 tesla.

The nano-solenoids analyzed through computer models at Rice University should be capable of producing powerful magnetic fields of about 1 tesla, about the same as the coils found in typical loudspeakers, according to Yakobson and his team – and about the same field strength as some MRI machines. They found the magnetic field would be strongest in the hollow, nanometer-wide cavity at the spiral's center.

A solenoid made with such a coil behaves as a quantum conductor whose current distribution between the core and exterior varies with applied voltage, resulting in nonlinear inductance.

=== Crumpled graphene ===
In 2016, Brown University introduced a method for "crumpling" graphene, adding wrinkles to the material on a nanoscale. This was achieved by depositing layers of graphene oxide onto a shrink film, then shrunken, with the film dissolved before being shrunken again on another sheet of film. The crumpled graphene became superhydrophobic, and when used as a battery electrode, the material was shown to have as much as a 400% increase in electrochemical current density.

== Mechanical synthesis ==
A rapidly increasing list of production techniques have been developed to enable graphene's use in commercial applications.

Isolated 2D crystals cannot be grown via chemical synthesis beyond small sizes even in principle, because the rapid growth of phonon density with increasing lateral size forces 2D crystallites to bend into the third dimension. In all cases, graphene must bond to a substrate to retain its two-dimensional shape.

=== Bottom-up and top-down methods ===
Small graphene structures, such as graphene quantum dots and nanoribbons, can be produced by "bottom-up" methods that assemble the lattice from organic molecule monomers (e. g. citric acid, glucose). "Top-down" methods, on the other hand, cut bulk graphite and graphene materials with strong chemicals (e. g. mixed acids).

=== Micro-mechanical cleavage ===
The most famous, clean and rather straightforward method of isolating graphene sheets, called micro-mechanical cleavage or more colloquially called the scotch tape method, was introduced by Novoselov et al. in 2004, which uses adhesive tape to mechanically cleave high-quality graphite crystals into successively thinner platelets. Other methods do exist like exfoliation.

=== Exfoliation techniques ===
==== Mechanical exfoliation ====
Geim and Novoselov initially used adhesive tape to pull graphene sheets away from graphite. Achieving single layers typically requires multiple exfoliation steps. After exfoliation, the flakes are deposited on a silicon wafer. Crystallites larger than 1 mm and visible to the naked eye can be obtained.

As of 2014, exfoliation produced graphene with the lowest number of defects and highest electron mobility. One specific exfoliation technique involved using a sharp single-crystal diamond wedge to penetrate the graphite source and precisely cleave individual layers. That same year, researchers also developed liquid-phase methods, creating defect-free, unoxidized graphene-containing liquids from graphite using mixers that generate extremely high local shear rates greater than 10×10^{4}.

A 2014 study published in Nature Materials demonstrated that scalable production of defect-free graphene is possible through shear exfoliation using a high-shear mixer. This technique can produce large quantities of few-layer graphene in solution while preserving structural integrity. As turbulence is not necessary for mechanical exfoliation, resonant acoustic mixing or low-speed ball milling can also be effective in the production of high-yield and water-soluble graphene.

==== Liquid phase exfoliation ====
Liquid phase exfoliation (LPE) is a relatively simple method that involves dispersing graphite in a liquid medium to produce graphene by sonication or high shear mixing, followed by centrifugation. Restacking is an issue with this technique unless solvents with appropriate surface energy are used (e.g. NMP). Adding a surfactant to a solvent prior to sonication prevents restacking by adsorbing to the graphene's surface. This produces a higher graphene concentration, but removing the surfactant requires chemical treatments.

LPE results in nanosheets with a broad size distribution and thicknesses roughly in the range of 1-10 monolayers. However, liquid cascade centrifugation can be used to size-select the suspensions and achieve monolayer enrichment.

Sonicating graphite at the interface of two immiscible liquids, most notably heptane and water, produced macro-scale graphene films. The graphene sheets are adsorbed to the high-energy interface between the materials and are kept from restacking. The sheets are up to about 95% transparent and conductive.

With definite cleavage parameters, the box-shaped graphene (BSG) nanostructure can be prepared on graphite crystal. A major advantage of LPE is that it can be used to exfoliate many inorganic 2D materials beyond graphene, e.g. BN, MoS_{2}, WS_{2}.

==== Exfoliation with supercritical carbon dioxide ====
Liquid-phase exfoliation can also be done by a less-known process of intercalating supercritical carbon dioxide (scCO2) into the interstitial spaces in the graphite lattice, followed by rapid depressurization. The scCO2 intercalates easily inside the graphite lattice at a pressure of roughly 100 atm. Carbon dioxide turns gaseous as soon as the vessel is depressurized and makes the graphite explode into few-layered graphene.

This method may have multiple advantages: being non-toxic, the graphite does not have to be chemically treated in any way before the process, and the whole process can be completed in a single step as opposed to other exfoliation methods.

=== Splitting monolayer carbon allotropes ===
Graphene can be created by opening carbon nanotubes by cutting or etching. In one such method, multi-walled carbon nanotubes were cut open in solution by action of potassium permanganate and sulfuric acid. In 2014, carbon nanotube-reinforced graphene was made via spin coating and annealing functionalized carbon nanotubes.

Another approach sprays buckyballs at supersonic speeds onto a substrate. The balls cracked open upon impact, and the resulting unzipped cages then bond together to form a graphene film.

== Chemical synthesis ==
=== Graphite oxide reduction ===
P. Boehm reported producing monolayer flakes of reduced graphene oxide in 1962. Rapid heating of graphite oxide and exfoliation yields highly dispersed carbon powder with a few percent of graphene flakes.

Another method is the reduction of graphite oxide monolayer films, e.g. by hydrazine with annealing in argon/hydrogen with an almost intact carbon framework that allows efficient removal of functional groups. Measured charge carrier mobility exceeded 1,000 cm/Vs (10 m/Vs).

Burning a graphite oxide coated DVD produced a conductive graphene film (1,738 siemens per meter) and specific surface area (1,520 square meters per gram) that was highly resistant and malleable.

A dispersed reduced graphene oxide suspension was synthesized in water by a hydrothermal dehydration method without using any surfactant. The approach is facile, industrially applicable, environmentally friendly, and cost-effective. Viscosity measurements confirmed that the graphene colloidal suspension (graphene nanofluid) exhibits Newtonian behavior, with the viscosity showing a close resemblance to that of water.

=== Molten salts ===
Graphite particles can be corroded in molten salts to form a variety of carbon nanostructures including graphene. Hydrogen cations, dissolved in molten lithium chloride, can be discharged on cathodically polarized graphite rods, which then intercalate, peeling graphene sheets. The graphene nanosheets produced displayed a single-crystalline structure with a lateral size of several hundred nanometers and a high degree of crystallinity and thermal stability.

=== Electrochemical synthesis ===
Electrochemical synthesis can exfoliate graphene. Varying a pulsed voltage controls thickness, flake area, and number of defects and affects its properties. The process begins by bathing the graphite in a solvent for intercalation. The process can be tracked by monitoring the solution's transparency with an LED and photodiode.

=== Hydrothermal self-assembly ===
Graphene has been prepared by using a sugar like glucose, fructose, etc. This substrate-free "bottom-up" synthesis is safer, simpler and more environmentally friendly than exfoliation. The method can control the thickness, ranging from monolayer to multilayer, which is known as the "Tang-Lau Method".

=== Sodium ethoxide pyrolysis ===
Gram-quantities were produced by the reaction of ethanol with sodium metal, followed by pyrolysis and washing with water.

=== Microwave-assisted oxidation ===
In 2012, microwave energy was reported to directly synthesize graphene in one step. This approach avoids use of potassium permanganate in the reaction mixture. It was also reported that by microwave radiation assistance, graphene oxide with or without holes can be synthesized by controlling microwave time. Microwave heating can dramatically shorten the reaction time from days to seconds.

Graphene can also be made by microwave assisted hydrothermal pyrolysis.

=== Thermal decomposition of silicon carbide ===
Heating silicon carbide (SiC) to high temperatures (1100 °C) under low pressures (c. 10^{−6} torr, or 10^{−4} Pa) reduces it to graphene.

== Vapor deposition and growth techniques ==
=== Chemical vapor deposition ===
==== Epitaxy ====
Epitaxial graphene growth on silicon carbide is a wafer-scale technique to produce graphene. Epitaxial graphene may be coupled to surfaces weakly enough (by the active valence electrons that create Van der Waals forces) to retain the two-dimensional electronic band structure of isolated graphene.

A normal silicon wafer coated with a layer of germanium (Ge) dipped in dilute hydrofluoric acid strips the naturally forming germanium oxide groups, creating hydrogen-terminated germanium. CVD can coat that with graphene.

The direct synthesis of graphene on insulator TiO_{2} with high-dielectric-constant (high-κ). A two-step CVD process is shown to grow graphene directly on TiO_{2} crystals or exfoliated TiO_{2} nanosheets without using any metal catalyst.

==== Metal substrates ====
CVD graphene can be grown on metal substrates including ruthenium, iridium, nickel and copper.

==== Roll-to-roll ====
In 2014, a two-step roll-to-roll manufacturing process was announced. The first roll-to-roll step produces the graphene via chemical vapor deposition. The second step binds the graphene to a substrate.

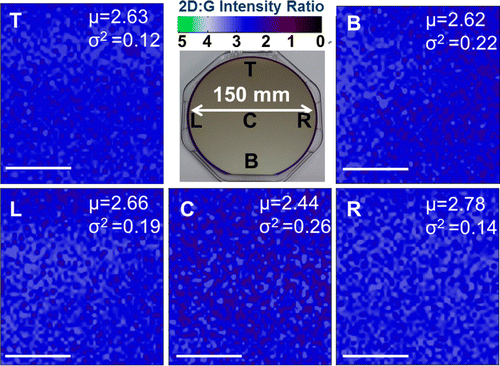
Large-area Raman mapping of CVD graphene on deposited Cu thin film on 150 mm SiO_{2}/Si wafers reveals >95% monolayer continuity and an average value of ~2.62 for I_{2D}/I_{G}. The scale bar is 200 μm.

==== Cold wall ====
Growing graphene in an industrial resistive-heating cold wall CVD system was claimed to produce graphene 100 times faster than conventional CVD systems, cut costs by 99%, and produce material with enhanced electronic qualities.

==== Wafer scale CVD graphene ====
CVD graphene is scalable and has been grown on deposited Cu thin film catalyst on 100 to 300 mm standard Si/SiO_{2} wafers on an Axitron Black Magic system. Monolayer graphene coverage of >95% is achieved on 100 to 300 mm wafer substrates with negligible defects, confirmed by extensive Raman mapping.

=== Solvent interface trapping method (SITM) ===
As reported by a group led by D. H. Adamson, graphene can be produced from natural graphite while preserving the integrity of the sheets using the solvent interface trapping method (SITM). SITM uses a high-energy interface, such as oil and water, to exfoliate graphite to graphene. Stacked graphite delaminates, or spreads, at the oil/water interface to produce few-layer graphene in a thermodynamically favorable process in much the same way as small molecule surfactants spread to minimize the interfacial energy. In this way, graphene behaves like a 2D surfactant. SITM has been reported for a variety of applications such conductive polymer-graphene foams, conductive polymer-graphene microspheres, conductive thin films and conductive inks.

=== Carbon dioxide reduction ===
A highly exothermic reaction combusts magnesium in an oxidation-reduction reaction with carbon dioxide, producing carbon nanoparticles including graphene and fullerenes.

=== Supersonic spray ===
Supersonic acceleration of droplets through a Laval nozzle was used to deposit reduced graphene oxide on a substrate. The energy of the impact rearranges those carbon atoms into flawless graphene.

=== Laser ===
In 2014, a CO_{2} infrared laser was used to produce patterned porous three-dimensional laser-induced graphene (LIG) film networks from commercial polymer films. The resulting material exhibits high electrical conductivity and surface area. The laser induction process is compatible with roll-to-roll manufacturing processes. A similar material, laser-induced graphene fibers (LIGF), was reported in 2018.

=== Flash Joule heating ===
In 2019, flash Joule heating (transient high-temperature electrothermal heating) was discovered to be a method to synthesize turbostratic graphene in bulk powder form. The method involves electrothermally converting various carbon sources, such as carbon black, coal, and food waste into micron-scale flakes of graphene. More recent works demonstrated the use of mixed plastic waste, waste rubber tires, and pyrolysis ash as carbon feedstocks. The graphenization process is kinetically controlled, and the energy dose is chosen to preserve the carbon in its graphenic state (excessive energy input leads to subsequent graphitization through annealing).

=== Ion implantation ===
Accelerating carbon ions inside an electrical field into a semiconductor made of thin nickel films on a substrate of SiO_{2}/Si, creates a wafer-scale (4 inches (100 mm)) wrinkle/tear/residue-free graphene layer at a relatively low temperature of 500 °C.

=== CMOS-compatible graphene ===
Integration of graphene in the widely employed CMOS fabrication process demands its transfer-free direct synthesis on dielectric substrates at temperatures below 500 °C. At the IEDM 2018, researchers from University of California, Santa Barbara, demonstrated a novel CMOS-compatible graphene synthesis process at 300 °C suitable for back-end-of-line (BEOL) applications. The process involves pressure-assisted solid-state diffusion of carbon through a thin-film of metal catalyst. The synthesized large-area graphene films were shown to exhibit high quality (via Raman characterization) and similar resistivity values when compared with high-temperature CVD synthesized graphene films of the same cross-section down to widths of 20 nm.

== Simulation ==
In addition to experimental investigation of graphene and graphene-based devices, numerical modeling and simulation of graphene has also been an important research topic. The Kubo formula provides an analytic expression for the graphene's conductivity and shows that it is a function of several physical parameters including wavelength, temperature, and chemical potential. Moreover, a surface conductivity model, which describes graphene as an infinitesimally thin (two-sided) sheet with a local and isotropic conductivity, has been proposed. This model permits the derivation of analytical expressions for the electromagnetic field in the presence of a graphene sheet in terms of a dyadic Green function (represented using Sommerfeld integrals) and exciting electric current.

Even though these analytical models and methods can provide results for several canonical problems for benchmarking purposes, many practical problems involving graphene, such as the design of arbitrarily shaped electromagnetic devices, are analytically intractable. With the recent advances in the field of computational electromagnetics (CEM), various accurate and efficient numerical methods have become available for analysis of electromagnetic field/wave interactions on graphene sheets and/or graphene-based devices. A comprehensive summary of computational tools developed for analyzing graphene-based devices/systems is proposed.

== Graphene analogs ==
Graphene analogs (also referred to as "artificial graphene") are two-dimensional systems which exhibit similar properties to graphene. Graphene analogs have been studied intensively since the discovery of graphene in 2004. People try to develop systems in which the physics is easier to observe and manipulate than in graphene. In those systems, electrons are not always the particles that are used. They might be optical photons, microwave photons, plasmons, microcavity polaritons, or even atoms. Also, the honeycomb structure in which those particles evolve can be of a different nature than carbon atoms in graphene. It can be, respectively, a photonic crystal, an array of metallic rods, metallic nanoparticles, a lattice of coupled microcavities, or an optical lattice.

== Applications ==
Graphene is a transparent and flexible conductor that holds great promise for various material/device applications, including solar cells, light-emitting diodes (LED), integrated photonic circuit devices, touch panels, and smart windows or phones. Smartphone products with graphene touch screens are already on the market.

In 2013, Head announced their new range of graphene tennis racquets.

As of 2015, there is one product available for commercial use: a graphene-infused printer powder. Many other uses for graphene have been proposed or are under development, in areas including electronics, biological engineering, filtration, lightweight/strong composite materials, photovoltaics and energy storage. Graphene is often produced as a powder and as a dispersion in a polymer matrix. This dispersion is supposedly suitable for advanced composites, paints and coatings, lubricants, oils and functional fluids, capacitors and batteries, thermal management applications, display materials and packaging, solar cells, inks and 3D-printer materials, and barriers and films.

On 2 August 2016, Briggs Automative Company's new Mono model is said to be made out of graphene as the first of both a street-legal track car and a production car.

In January 2018, graphene-based spiral inductors exploiting kinetic inductance at room temperature were first demonstrated at the University of California, Santa Barbara, led by Kaustav Banerjee. These inductors were predicted to allow significant miniaturization in radio-frequency integrated circuit applications.

The potential of epitaxial graphene on SiC for metrology has been shown since 2010, displaying quantum Hall resistance quantization accuracy of three parts per billion in monolayer epitaxial graphene. Over the years precisions of parts-per-trillion in the Hall resistance quantization and giant quantum Hall plateaus have been demonstrated. Developments in the encapsulation and doping of epitaxial graphene have led to the commercialization of epitaxial graphene quantum resistance standards.

Novel uses for graphene continue to be researched and explored. One such use is in combination with water-based epoxy resins to produce anticorrosive coatings. The van der Waals nature of graphene and other two-dimensional (2D) materials also permits van der Waals heterostructures and integrated circuits based on Van der Waals integration of 2D materials.

Graphene is utilized in detecting gasses and chemicals in environmental monitoring, developing highly sensitive biosensors for medical diagnostics, and creating flexible, wearable sensors for health monitoring. Graphene's transparency also enhances optical sensors, making them more effective in imaging and spectroscopy.

== Toxicity ==
One review on graphene toxicity published in 2016 by Lalwani et al. summarizes the in vitro, in vivo, antimicrobial and environmental effects and highlights the various mechanisms of graphene toxicity. Another review published in 2016 by Ou et al. focused on graphene-family nanomaterials (GFNs) and revealed several typical mechanisms such as physical destruction, oxidative stress, DNA damage, inflammatory response, apoptosis, autophagy, and necrosis.

A 2020 study showed that the toxicity of graphene is dependent on several factors such as shape, size, purity, post-production processing steps, oxidative state, functional groups, dispersion state, synthesis methods, route and dose of administration, and exposure times.

In 2014, research at Stony Brook University showed that graphene nanoribbons, graphene nanoplatelets, and graphene nano–onions are non-toxic at concentrations up to 50 μg/ml. These nanoparticles do not alter the differentiation of human bone marrow stem cells towards osteoblasts (bone) or adipocytes (fat), suggesting that at low doses, graphene nanoparticles are safe for biomedical applications. In 2013, research at Brown University found that 10 μm few-layered graphene flakes can pierce cell membranes in solution. They were observed to enter initially via sharp and jagged points, allowing graphene to be internalized in the cell. The physiological effects of this remain unknown, and this remains a relatively unexplored field.

== See also ==
- Borophene – Allotrope of boron
- Carbon fiber – Light, strong and rigid composite material
- Penta-graphene
- GraphExeter – Material made of graphene sheets
- Phagraphene
- Plumbene – Material made up of a single layer of lead atoms
- Silicene – Two-dimensional allotrope of silicon
