= Electronic properties of graphene =

Sigma and pi bonds in graphene. Sigma bonds result from an overlap of sp^{2} hybrid orbitals, whereas pi bonds emerge from tunneling between the protruding p_{z} orbitals. For clarity, only one p_{z} orbital is shown with its three nearest neighbors.

Graphene is a semimetal whose conduction and valence bands meet at the Dirac points, which are six locations in momentum space, the vertices of its hexagonal Brillouin zone, divided into three non-equivalent sets of three points. The two sets are labeled K and K′. The sets give graphene a valley degeneracy of gv = 2. By contrast, for traditional semiconductors the primary point of interest is generally Γ, where momentum is zero. Four electronic properties separate it from other condensed matter systems.

== Electronic spectrum ==
Electrons propagating through graphene's honeycomb lattice effectively lose their mass, producing quasi-particles that are described by a 2D analogue of the Dirac equation rather than the Schrödinger equation for spin-1/2 particles.

=== Dispersion relation ===
Electronic band structure of graphene. Valence and conduction bands meet at the six vertices of the hexagonal Brillouin zone and form linearly dispersing Dirac cones.

When atoms are placed onto the graphene hexagonal lattice, the overlap between the p_{z}(π) orbitals and the s or the p_{x} and p_{y} orbitals is zero by symmetry. The p_{z} electrons forming the π bands in graphene can be treated independently. Within this π-band approximation, using a conventional tight-binding model, the dispersion relation (restricted to first-nearest-neighbor interactions only) that produces energy of the electrons with wave vector $\mathbf{k}=[k_x,k_y]$ is

$$E(\mathbf{k})=\pm\,\gamma_0\sqrt{1+4\cos^2{\tfrac{1}{2}a k_x}+4\cos{\tfrac{1}{2}a k_x} \cdot \cos{\tfrac{\sqrt{3}}{2}a k_y}}$$

with the nearest-neighbor (π orbitals) hopping energy γ_{0} ≈ 2.8 eV and the lattice constant a ≈ 2.46 Å. The conduction and valence bands, respectively, correspond to the different signs. With one p_{z} electron per atom in this model the valence band is fully occupied, while the conduction band is vacant. The two bands touch at the zone corners (the K point in the Brillouin zone), where there is a zero density of states but no band gap. The graphene sheet thus displays a semimetallic (or zero-gap semiconductor) character. Two of the six Dirac points are independent, while the rest are equivalent by symmetry. In the vicinity of the K-points the energy depends linearly on the wave vector, similar to a relativistic particle. Since an elementary cell of the lattice has a basis of two atoms, the wave function has an effective 2-spinor structure.

As a consequence, at low energies, even neglecting the true spin, the electrons can be described by an equation that is formally equivalent to the massless Dirac equation. Hence, the electrons and holes are called Dirac fermions. This pseudo-relativistic description is restricted to the chiral limit, i.e., to vanishing rest mass M_{0}, which leads to additional features:

$$- i v_F\, \vec \sigma \cdot \nabla \psi(\mathbf{r})\,=\,E\psi(\mathbf{r}).$$

Here v_{F} ≈ 10^{6} m/s (0.003 c) is the Fermi velocity in graphene, which replaces the velocity of light in the Dirac theory; $\vec{\sigma}$ is the vector of the Pauli matrices; $\psi(\mathbf{r})$ is the two-component wave function of the electrons and E is their energy.

The equation describing the electrons' linear dispersion relation is

$$E(k)=\hbar v_\text{F} k$$

where the wavevector $\textstyle k=\sqrt{k_x^2+k_y^2}$ is measured from the Dirac points (the zero of energy is chosen here to coincide with the Dirac points). The equation uses a pseudospin matrix formula that describes two sublattices of the honeycomb lattice.

=== 'Massive' electrons ===
Graphene's unit cell has two identical carbon atoms and two zero-energy states: one in which the electron resides on atom A, the other in which the electron resides on atom B. However, if the two atoms in the unit cell are not identical, the situation changes. Hunt et al. showed that placing hexagonal boron nitride (h-BN) in contact with graphene can alter the potential felt at atom A versus atom B enough that the electrons develop a mass and accompanying band gap of about 30 meV.

The mass can be positive or negative. An arrangement that slightly raises the energy of an electron on atom A relative to atom B gives it a positive mass, while an arrangement that raises the energy of atom B produces a negative electron mass. The two versions behave alike and are indistinguishable via optical spectroscopy. An electron traveling from a positive-mass region to a negative-mass region must cross an intermediate region where its mass once again becomes zero. This region is gapless and therefore metallic. Metallic modes bounding semiconducting regions of opposite-sign mass is a hallmark of a topological phase and display much the same physics as topological insulators.

If the mass in graphene can be controlled, electrons can be confined to massless regions by surrounding them with massive regions, allowing the patterning of quantum dots, wires and other mesoscopic structures. It also produces one-dimensional conductors along the boundary. These wires would be protected against backscattering and could carry currents without dissipation.

Researchers at the Georgia Institute of Technology created the first functional semiconductor from epitaxial graphene on a silicon carbide substrate in 2024. Using a quasi-equilibrium annealing method, they achieved a band gap of 0.6 eV and a room-temperature mobility exceeding 5,000 cm2 V−1 s−1, ten times that of silicon.

== Single-atom wave propagation ==
Electron waves in graphene propagate within a single-atom layer, making them sensitive to the proximity of other materials such as high-κ dielectrics, superconductors and ferromagnetics.

== Electron transport ==
Graphene displays remarkable electron mobility at room temperature, with reported values in excess of 15000 cm^{2}⋅V^{−1}⋅s^{−1}. Hole and electron mobilities were expected to be nearly identical. The mobility is nearly independent of temperature between 10 K and 100 K, which implies that the dominant scattering mechanism is defect scattering. Scattering by graphene's acoustic phonons intrinsically limits room temperature mobility to 200000 cm^{2}⋅V^{−1}⋅s^{−1} at a carrier density of 10^{12} cm^{−2}, 10×10^{6} times greater than copper.

The corresponding resistivity of graphene sheets would be 10^{−6} Ω⋅cm. This is less than the resistivity of silver, the lowest otherwise known at room temperature. However, on SiO_{2} substrates, scattering of electrons by optical phonons of the substrate is a larger effect than scattering by graphene's own phonons. This limits mobility to 40000 cm^{2}⋅V^{−1}⋅s^{−1}.

Charge transport is affected by adsorption of contaminants such as water and oxygen molecules. This leads to non-repetitive and large hysteresis I-V characteristics. Researchers must carry out electrical measurements in vacuum. Graphene surfaces can be protected by a coating with materials such as SiN, PMMA and h-BN. In January 2015, the first stable graphene device operation in air over several weeks was reported, for graphene whose surface was protected by aluminum oxide. In 2015 lithium-coated graphene was observed to exhibit superconductivity and in 2017 evidence for unconventional superconductivity was demonstrated in single layer graphene placed on the electron-doped (non-chiral) d-wave superconductor Pr_{2−x}Ce_{x}CuO_{4} (PCCO).

Electrical resistance in 40-nanometer-wide nanoribbons of epitaxial graphene changes in discrete steps. The ribbons' conductance exceeds predictions by a factor of 10. The ribbons can act more like optical waveguides or quantum dots, allowing electrons to flow smoothly along the ribbon edges. In copper, resistance increases in proportion to length as electrons encounter impurities.

Transport is dominated by two modes. One is ballistic and temperature independent, while the other is thermally activated. Ballistic electrons resemble those in cylindrical carbon nanotubes. At room temperature, resistance increases abruptly at a particular length—the ballistic mode at 16 micrometres and the other at 160 nanometres.

Graphene electrons can cover micrometer distances without scattering, even at room temperature.

Despite zero carrier density near the Dirac points, graphene exhibits a minimum conductivity on the order of $4e^2/h$. The origin of this minimum conductivity is unclear. However, rippling of the graphene sheet or ionized impurities in the SiO_{2} substrate may lead to local puddles of carriers that allow conduction. Several theories suggest that the minimum conductivity should be $4e^2/{(\pi}h)$; however, most measurements are of order $4e^2/h$ or greater and depend on impurity concentration.

Near zero carrier density graphene exhibits positive photoconductivity and negative photoconductivity at high carrier density. This is governed by the interplay between photoinduced changes of both the Drude weight and the carrier scattering rate.

Graphene doped with various gaseous species (both acceptors and donors) can be returned to an undoped state by gentle heating in vacuum. Even for dopant concentrations in excess of 10^{12} cm^{−2} carrier mobility exhibits no observable change. Graphene doped with potassium in ultra-high vacuum at low temperature can reduce mobility 20-fold. The mobility reduction is reversible on removing the potassium.

Due to graphene's two dimensions, charge fractionalization (where the apparent charge of individual pseudoparticles in low-dimensional systems is less than a single quantum) is thought to occur. It may therefore be a suitable material for constructing quantum computers using anyonic circuits.

In 2018, superconductivity was reported in twisted bilayer graphene.

== Excitonic properties ==
First-principle calculations with quasiparticle corrections and many-body effects explore the electronic and optical properties of graphene-based materials. The approach is described as three stages. With GW calculation, the properties of graphene-based materials are accurately investigated, including bulk graphene, nanoribbons, edge and surface functionalized armchair oribbons, hydrogen saturated armchair ribbons, Josephson effect in graphene SNS junctions with single localized defect and armchair ribbon scaling properties.

== Magnetic properties ==
In 2014 researchers magnetized graphene by placing it on an atomically smooth layer of magnetic yttrium iron garnet. The graphene's electronic properties were unaffected. Prior approaches involved doping. The dopant's presence negatively affected its electronic properties.

=== Strong magnetic fields ===
In magnetic fields of ~10 tesla, additional plateaus of Hall conductivity at $\sigma_{xy}=\nu e^2/h$ with $\nu=0,\pm {1},\pm {4}$ are observed. The observation of a plateau at $\nu=3$ and the fractional quantum Hall effect at $\nu=1/3$ were reported.

These observations with $\nu=0,\pm 1,\pm 3, \pm 4$ indicate that the four-fold degeneracy (two valley and two spin degrees of freedom) of the Landau energy levels is partially or completely lifted. One hypothesis is that the magnetic catalysis of symmetry breaking is responsible for lifting the degeneracy.

== Spin transport ==
Graphene is claimed to be an ideal material for spintronics due to its small spin–orbit interaction and the near absence of nuclear magnetic moments in carbon (as well as a weak hyperfine interaction). Electrical spin current injection and detection has been demonstrated up to room temperature. Spin coherence length above 1 micrometre at room temperature was observed, and control of the spin current polarity with an electrical gate was observed at low temperature.

Spintronic and magnetic properties can be present in graphene simultaneously. Low-defect graphene nanomeshes manufactured using a non-lithographic method exhibit large-amplitude ferromagnetism even at room temperature. Additionally a spin pumping effect is found for fields applied in parallel with the planes of few-layer ferromagnetic nanomeshes, while a magnetoresistance hysteresis loop is observed under perpendicular fields.

== Dirac fluid ==
Charged particles in high-purity graphene behave as a strongly interacting, quasi-relativistic plasma. The particles move in a fluid-like manner, traveling along a single path and interacting with high frequency. The behavior was observed in a graphene sheet faced on both sides with a h-BN crystal sheet.

== Anomalous quantum Hall effect ==
The quantum Hall effect is a quantum mechanical version of the Hall effect, The Hall effect occurs when a magnetic field causes a perpendicular (transverse) current in a material. In the quantum Hall effect, the transverse conductivity $\sigma_{xy}$ is quantized in integer multiples of a basic quantity:

$$e^2/h$$

where e is the elementary electric charge and h is the Planck constant. This phenomenon is typically observed in very clean silicon or gallium arsenide solids at temperatures around 3 K and high magnetic fields.

=== Quantum Hall effect in graphene ===
Graphenem, a single layer of carbon atoms, exhibits an unusual form of the quantum Hall effect. In graphene, the steps of conductivity quantization are shifted by 1/2 compared to the standard sequence and have an additional factor of 4. This can be expressed as:

$$\sigma_{xy}=\pm {4\cdot\left(N + 1/2 \right)e^2}/h$$

where N is the Landau level. The factor of 4 arises due to the double valley and double spin degeneracies of electrons in graphene. These anomalies can be observed even at room temperature (about 20 °C or 293 K).

=== Behavior of electrons in graphene ===
This anomalous behavior is due to graphene's massless Dirac electrons. In a magnetic field, these electrons form a Landau level at the Dirac point with an energy that is precisely zero. This is a result of the Atiyah–Singer index theorem and causes the "+1/2" term in the Hall conductivity for neutral graphene.

In bilayer graphene, the quantum Hall effect is also observed but with only one of the two anomalies. The Hall conductivity in bilayer graphene is given by:

$$\sigma_{xy}=\pm {4\cdot N\cdot e^2}/h$$

In this case, the first plateau at N = 0 is absent, meaning bilayer graphene remains metallic at the neutrality point.

=== Additional observations in graphene ===
Unlike normal metals, graphene's longitudinal resistance shows maxima, not minima, for integral values of the Landau filling factor in Shubnikov–de Haas oscillations. This is termed the integral quantum Hall effect. These oscillations exhibit a phase shift of π, known as Berry's phase, which is due to the zero effective mass of carriers near the Dirac points. Despite this zero effective mass, the temperature dependence of the oscillations indicates a non-zero cyclotron mass for the carriers.

=== Experimental observations ===
Graphene samples prepared on nickel films and on both the silicon and carbon faces of silicon carbide show the anomalous quantum Hall effect in electrical measurements. Graphitic layers on the carbon face of silicon carbide exhibit a clear Dirac spectrum in angle-resolved photoemission experiments. This effect is also observed in cyclotron resonance and tunneling experiments.

== Casimir effect ==
The Casimir effect is an interaction between disjoint neutral bodies provoked by the fluctuations of the electrodynamical vacuum. Mathematically it can be explained by considering the normal modes of electromagnetic fields, which explicitly depend on the boundary (or matching) conditions on the interacting bodies' surfaces. Since graphene/electromagnetic field interaction is strong for a one-atom-thick material, the Casimir effect is of interest.

== Van der Waals force ==
The Van der Waals force (or dispersion force) is also unusual, obeying an inverse cubic, asymptotic power law in contrast to the usual inverse quartic.

== Effect of substrate ==
The electronic properties of graphene are significantly influenced by the supporting substrate. The Si(100)/H surface does not perturb graphene's electronic properties, whereas the interaction between it and the clean Si(100) surface changes its electronic states significantly. This effect results from the covalent bonding between C and surface Si atoms, modifying the π-orbital network of the graphene layer. The local density of states shows that the bonded C and Si surface states are highly disturbed near the Fermi energy.

== Comparison with nanoribbon ==
If the in-plane direction is confined, in which case it is referred to as a nanoribbon, its electronic structure is different. If it is "zig-zag" (diagram), the bandgap is zero. If it is "armchair" (diagram), the bandgap is non-zero (see figure).

GNR band structure for zig-zag orientation. Tightbinding calculations show that zig-zag orientation is always metallic.

GNR band structure for armchair orientation. Tightbinding calculations show that armchair orientation can be semiconducting or metallic depending on width (chirality).
