= Wiedemann–Franz law =

Physical law relating thermal and electrical conductivities

Plot of the Wiedemann–Franz law for copper. Left axis: specific electric resistance ρ in 10^{−10} Ω m, red line and specific thermal conductivity λ in W/(K m), green line. Right axis: ρ times λ in 100 U^{2}/K, blue line and Lorenz number ρ λ / K in U^{2}/K^{2}, Cyan line. Lorenz number is more or less constant.

In physics, the Wiedemann–Franz law states that the ratio of the electronic contribution of the thermal conductivity (κ) to the electrical conductivity (σ) of a metal is proportional to the temperature (T).
$$\frac \kappa \sigma = LT$$

Theoretically, the proportionality constant L, known as the Lorenz number, is equal to
$$L = \frac \kappa {\sigma T} = \frac{\pi^2} 3 \left(\frac{k_{\rm B}} e \right)^2 = 2.44\times 10^{-8}\;\mathrm{V^2{\cdot}K}^{-2},$$
where k_{B} is the Boltzmann constant and e is the elementary charge.

This empirical law is named after Gustav Wiedemann and Rudolph Franz, who in 1853 reported that κ/σ has approximately the same value for different metals at the same temperature. The proportionality of κ/σ with temperature was discovered by Ludvig Lorenz in 1872.

== Derivation ==
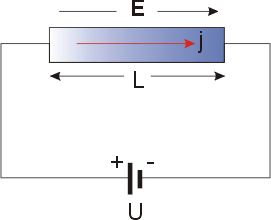
Electric circuit with metal and a battery U. The arrows indicate the direction of the electric field E and the electric current density j.

Qualitatively, this relationship is based upon the fact that the heat and electrical transport both involve the free electrons in the metal.

The mathematical expression of the law can be derived as following. Electrical conduction of metals is a well-known phenomenon and is attributed to the free conduction electrons, which can be measured as sketched in the figure. The current density j is observed to be proportional to the applied electric field and follows Ohm's law where the prefactor is the specific electrical conductivity. Since the electric field and the current density are vectors Ohm's law is expressed here in bold face. The conductivity can in general be expressed as a tensor of the second rank (3×3 matrix). Here we restrict the discussion to isotropic, i.e. scalar conductivity. The specific resistivity is the inverse of the conductivity. Both parameters will be used in the following.

The thermal conductivity is given by
$$\kappa = \frac{1}{3}c n\,\ell \,\langle v\rangle$$
where $c$ is the heat capacity per electron, $n$ is the number density of charge carriers, $\ell$ is the mean free path of the electrons, and $\langle v\rangle$ is the mean speed of the carriers.

The electrical conductivity is given by
$$\sigma = \frac{ne^2\tau}{m} = \frac{ne^2\ell}{m\langle v\rangle}.$$

where $\tau$ is the mean free time and m the mass of the charge carriers.

The ratio is given by
$$\frac{\kappa}{\sigma} = \frac{1}{3} \frac{c\, m\langle v \rangle^2}{e^2}\,.$$

=== Drude model derivation ===
Paul Drude (c. 1900) realized that the phenomenological description of conductivity can be formulated quite generally (electron-, ion-, heat- etc. conductivity). Although the phenomenological description is incorrect for conduction electrons, it can serve as a preliminary treatment.

The assumption is that the electrons move freely in the solid like in an ideal gas. The force applied to the electron by the electric field leads to an acceleration according to
$$\mathbf{F} = - e \mathbf{E} = m \frac{\;d\mathbf{v}}{dt}$$
$$\;d\mathbf{v}= - \frac{e \mathbf{E}} m \, dt$$

This would lead, however, to a constant acceleration and, ultimately, to an infinite velocity. The further assumption therefore is that the electrons bump into obstacles (like defects or phonons) once in a while which limits their free flight. This establishes an average or drift velocity V_{d}. The drift velocity is related to the average scattering time as becomes evident from the following relations.
$$\frac{d\mathbf{v}}{dt}= - \frac{e \mathbf{E}} m - \frac{1}{\tau} \mathbf{v}$$

For the kinetic theory of gases $c = 3 k_{\rm B}/2$, and
$$\langle v\rangle = \sqrt{\frac{8k_{\rm B} T}{\pi m}}.$$
Therefore,
$$\frac \kappa \sigma = \frac{c m \, \langle {v} \rangle^2}{3e^2} = \frac{4}{\pi} \frac{k_{\rm B}^2T}{e^2} = 0.94\times 10^{-8}\;\mathrm{V}^2\mathrm{K}^{-2} ,$$
which is the Wiedemann–Franz law with an erroneous proportionality constant $\frac{4}{\pi}\approx 1.27$.

In Drude's original paper he used $\langle v^2\rangle$ instead of $\langle v\rangle^2$, and also accidentally used a factor of 2. This meant his result is
$$L = 3 \left(\frac{k_{\rm B}} e \right)^2 = 2.22\times 10^{-8}\;\mathrm{V}^2\mathrm{K}^{-2},$$
which is very close to experimental values. This is in fact due to 3 mistakes that conspired to make his result more accurate than warranted: the factor of 2 mistake; the specific heat per electron is in fact about 100 times less than $3k_{\rm B}/2$; the mean squared velocity of an electron is in fact about 100 times larger.

=== Free electron model ===
After taking into account the quantum effects, as in the free electron model, the heat capacity is given by
$$c=\frac{\pi^2}{2}\frac{T}{E_{\mathrm F} }k^2_{\mathrm B},$$
where $E_{\mathrm F }=mv_{\mathrm F}^2/2$ is the Fermi energy and $\langle v\rangle = v_{\mathrm F}$ is the Fermi speed.

The proportionality constant is then corrected to $\frac{\pi^2} 3\approx3.29$, which agrees with experimental values.

== Temperature dependence ==
The value L_{0} = 2.44×10^{−8} V^{2}⋅K^{−2} results from the fact that at low temperatures ($T\rightarrow 0$ K) the heat and charge currents are carried by the same quasi-particles: electrons or holes. At finite temperatures two mechanisms produce a deviation of the ratio $L = \kappa/(\sigma T)$ from the theoretical Lorenz value L_{0}: (i) other thermal carriers such as phonons or magnons, (ii) Inelastic scattering. As the temperature tends to 0 K, inelastic scattering becomes weak and promotes large q scattering values (trajectory a in the figure). For each electron transported, a thermal excitation is also carried and the Lorenz number is reached L = L_{0}. Note that in a perfect metal, inelastic scattering would be completely absent in the limit $T\rightarrow 0$ K and the thermal conductivity would vanish $\kappa \to 0; L \to 0$. At finite temperature small q scattering values are possible (trajectory b in the figure) and electrons can be transported without the transport of a thermal excitation L(T) < L_{0}. At higher temperatures, the contribution of phonons to thermal transport in a system becomes important. This can lead to L(T) > L_{0}. Above the Debye temperature the phonon contribution to thermal transport is constant and the ratio L(T) is again found constant.

Sketch of the various scattering process important for the Wiedemann–Franz law.

== Violations ==
Experiments have shown that the value of L, while roughly constant, is not exactly the same for all metals. Charles Kittel's Introduction to Solid State Physics gives some values of L ranging from L = 2.23×10^{−8} V^{2}· K^{−2} for copper at 0 °C to L = 3.2×10^{−8} V^{2}· K^{−2} for tungsten at 100 °C. Rosenberg notes that the Wiedemann–Franz law is generally valid for high temperatures and for low (i.e., a few Kelvins) temperatures, but may not hold at intermediate temperatures.

In many high purity metals both the electrical and thermal conductivities rise as temperature is decreased. In certain materials (such as silver or aluminum) however, the value of L also may decrease with temperature. In the purest samples of silver and at very low temperatures, L can drop by as much as a factor of 10.

In degenerate semiconductors, the Lorenz number L has a strong dependency on certain system parameters: dimensionality, strength of interatomic interactions and Fermi level. This law is not valid or the value of the Lorenz number can be reduced at least in the following cases: manipulating electronic density of states, varying doping density and layer thickness in superlattices and materials with correlated carriers. In thermoelectric materials there are also corrections due to boundary conditions, specifically open circuit vs. closed circuit.

In 2011, N. Wakeham et al. found that the ratio of the thermal and electrical Hall conductivities in the metallic phase of quasi-one-dimensional lithium molybdenum purple bronze Li_{0.9}Mo_{6}O_{17} diverges with decreasing temperature, reaching a value five orders of magnitude larger than that found in conventional metals obeying the Wiedemann–Franz law. This due to spin-charge separation and it behaving as a Luttinger liquid.

A Berkeley-led study in 2016 by S. Lee et al. also found a large violation of the Wiedemann–Franz law near the insulator-metal transition in VO_{2} nanobeams. In the metallic phase, the electronic contribution to thermal conductivity was much smaller than what would be expected from the Wiedemann–Franz law. The results can be explained in terms of independent propagation of charge and heat in a strongly correlated system.

A 2025 study by a team at the Indian Institute of Science (IISc), collaborating with researchers from the National Institute for Materials Science in Japan, found that very pure graphene, at the Dirac point, where it becomes neither metal nor insulator, especially when its temperature is cold enough, forms a Dirac fluid and exhibits a negative relationship between electrical and thermal conductivities, the opposite of what the Wiedemann-Franz law predicts for metals.

== Analogous relations in other systems ==
In 2015, Kouki Nakata, Pascal Simon, and Daniel Loss derived a magnonic analogue of the Wiedemann-Franz law, i.e., magnonic Wiedemann-Franz law. The thermomagnetic ratio characterizing magnon (spin) and heat transport becomes linear in temperature, being universal, in spite of the fact that the quantum-statistical properties of bosons (magnons) and fermions (electrons) are fundamentally different, in particular in the low temperature regime where quantum effects dominate. The magnonic analogue of the Lorenz number for electron (charge) transport, i.e., the magnetic Lorenz number, changes depending on the details of systems such as junctions or bulks.

In 2020, Galen Craven and Abraham Nitzan derived a Wiedemann–Franz law for molecular systems in which electronic conduction is dominated not by free electron motion as in metals, but instead by electron transfer between molecular sites. The molecular Wiedemann–Franz law is given by
$$\frac{\kappa}{\sigma} = L_\text{M}\frac{\lambda}{k_{\rm B}}$$
where
$$L_\text{M} = \frac{1} 2 \left(\frac{k_{\rm B}} e \right)^2$$
is the Lorenz number for molecules and $\lambda$ is the reorganization energy for electron transfer.

== See also ==
- Drude model
