= Rudolph Franz =

German physicist

Rudolph Franz (December 16, 1826 in Berlin – December 31, 1902 in Berlin) was a German physicist.

== Life ==
Franz studied math and natural sciences at the University of Bonn and got his doctorate in 1850. He started working as a teacher in Berlin the same year.

His research led to his habilitation in 1857 at the Humboldt University of Berlin. Until 1865 he was teaching physical sciences (especially thermodynamics).

He became known for his collaboration with Gustav Heinrich Wiedemann, with whom he discovered the Wiedemann-Franz law in 1853, which relates the thermal conductivity and electrical conductivity with each other.

== Literature ==
- Adolf Wißner (1961). "Franz, Johann Carl Rudolph". Neue Deutsche Biographie (in German). Vol. 5. Berlin: Duncker & Humblot. pp. 376–377. (full text online).
