= Programmable magnet =

Programmed magnets are magnetic structures that incorporate correlated patterns of magnets with alternating polarity, designed to achieve a desired behavior and deliver stronger local force. By varying the magnetic fields and strengths, different mechanical behaviors can be controlled.

Correlated magnet pairs can be programmed to attract or repel with a prescribed force and engagement distance, or, to attract or repel at a certain spatial orientation. Correlated magnets can be programmed to interact only with other magnetic structures that have been coded to respond. Correlated magnets can even be programmed to attract and repel at the same time. Compared to conventional magnets, the correlated magnet provides much stronger holding force to the target and stronger shear resistance. The programmable behavior is achieved by creating multipole structures comprising multiple magnetic elements of varying size, location, orientation, and saturation. The sizes range 1 to 4 mm. By overlapping, a very intricate magnetic field can be produced. There are four main functions that correlated magnets can achieve: align, attach, latch, and spring.

Programmed magnets can be programmed, or coded, by varying the polarity and/or field strengths of each source of the arrays of magnetic sources that make up each structure. The resulting magnetic structures can be one-dimensional, two-dimensional, three-dimensional, and even four-dimensional if produced using an electromagnetic array.

Correlated magnetic structures can be developed from ferrites, rare-earth materials (e.g. Neodymium magnet, Samarium–cobalt magnet), ceramics, and electromagnets alike, and the correlation effects are scalable from very large permanent magnets to nanometer-scale devices. Multipole magnetic devices may be constructed from discrete permanent magnets, or by exposing heated magnetizable material to a coded magnetic field.

The science of correlated magnetics was created in 2008 by Larry W. Fullerton in his laboratory at Cedar Ridge in North Alabama. Correlated Magnetics Research (CMR) was formed to pursue research and development of the coded magnets technology and to license the technology to business entities across industry. More than 65 patents have been filed for the technology in the U.S. and around the world. CMR trademarked the term "Polymagnets" for this technology. The coding theory used to design radio frequency signals in communication and radar is applied to form the magnetic regions of correlated magnets. The discovery was announced during a press conference in October, 2009, in Huntsville, Alabama. The world first's 3D magnetizing printer is developed by CMR, which is called MagPrinter. This printer consists of a magnetizing coil in a cabinet with a motion-control system. A programmed magnet can be easily made from reprogramming a conventional magnetic material in a few minutes.

== Applications ==
For the small size applications, correlated magnets can be used in positioning devices, consumer electronics, magnetic couplings, and vehicle attachment. Potential applications include attach and release work-holding mechanisms, magnetic separators, fluid seals and valves, motor and motion control, factory automation, prosthetics, security devices, and power generation.
