= Phagraphene =

Phagraphene (/fæˈɡræfiːn/) is a proposed graphene allotrope composed of 5-6-7 carbon rings. Phagraphene was proposed in 2015 based on systematic evolutionary structure searching. Theoretical calculations showed that phagraphene is not only dynamically and thermally stable, but also has distorted Dirac cones. The direction-dependent cones are robust against external strain with tuneable Fermi velocities.

Higher-energy allotropes named Haeckelite contained penta- hexa- and hepta-carbon rings. Three types (rectangular, oblique and hexagonal) were proposed as early as 2000. These metastable allotropes have a trivial intrinsic metallic behavior.

Phagraphene is predicted to have a potential energy of 193.2 kcal/mol. The bond order is 1.33, the same as for graphene.

== PHA/graphene ==
An unrelated material called PHA/graphene is a polyhydroxyalkanoate graphene composite.
