= Larry W. Fullerton =

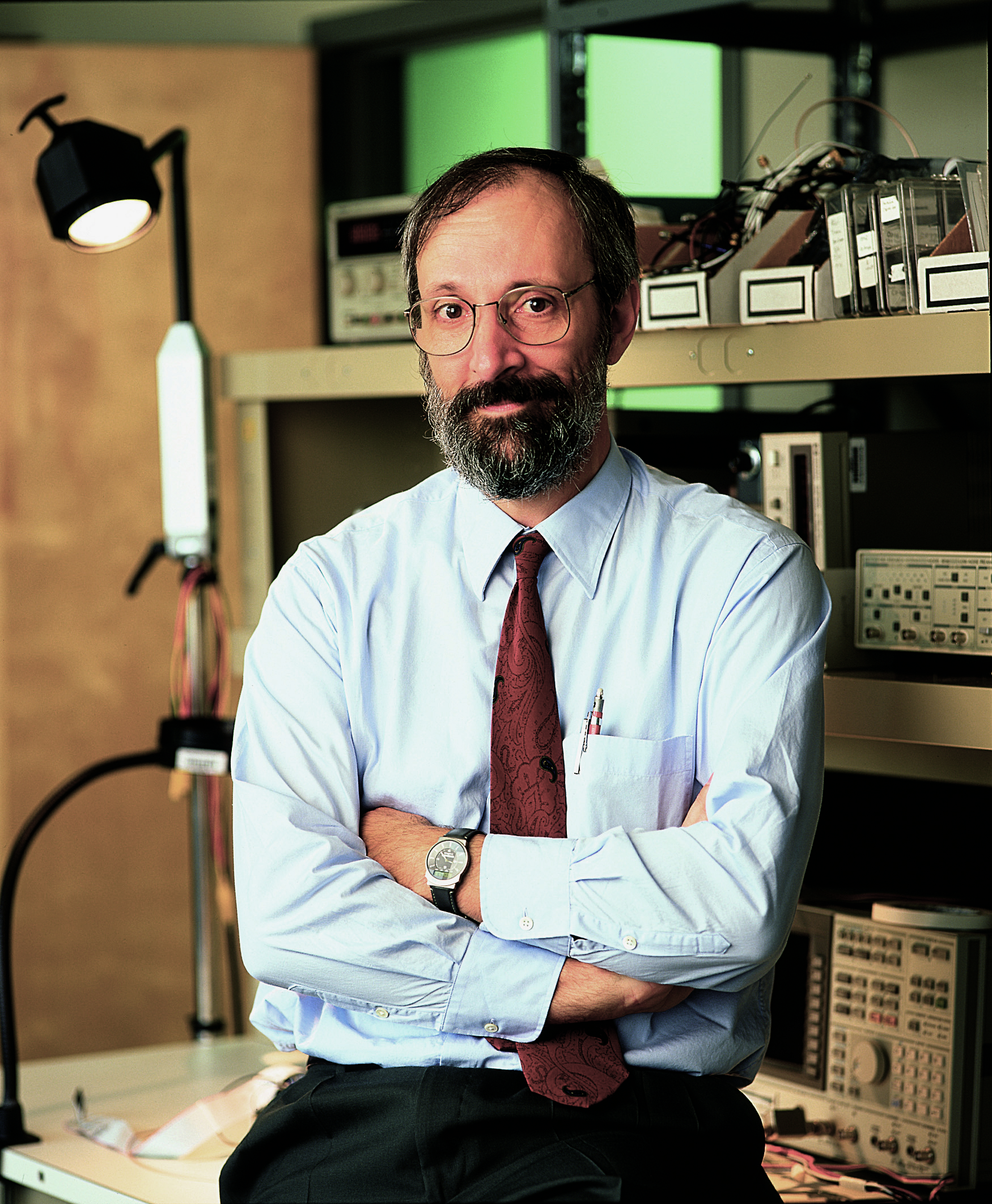
- Born: Larry Wayne Fullerton; December 11, 1950
- Died: November 24, 2016 (aged 65); New Hope, Alabama
- Awards: Aviation Week & Space Technology Laureate Award (2001); Popular Mechanics Breakthrough Award (2010); HOBY Inspiration Award; Fast Company's 100 Most Creative People in Business (2010); E-Week Award from the Institute of Electrical and Electronics Engineers (2000)

Larry W. Fullerton (December 11, 1950 – November 24, 2016) was an American inventor best known for the invention of ultra-wideband technology, correlated magnetics, and a number of other industrial, military, and consumer technologies. He co-founded Time Domain Corporation in 1987 and Cedar Ridge Research in 2006. He holds more than 500 patents around the world for technologies as diverse as ground sonar, new magnetics technology, and radio pulse technology.

== Early life ==
Fullerton was born in Arkansas into a military family, and spent most of his younger years in Europe. He returned to the United States with his family in 1969. In 1979 he moved to Alabama after landing a job with NASA in Huntsville, Alabama.

== Career ==
According to Discover magazine, Fullerton's ultra-wideband technology is a method of transmitting pulse signals at low levels across an ultra-wide frequency range. This low level allows them to be transmitted without interfering with the standard radio waves being transmitted. The idea for the new technology came to Fullerton while a college student at the University of Arkansas in 1973. Because the technology was to make use of a broad range of the radio spectrum (though at low power, and so not interfering with other users), a waiver from the Federal Communications Commission was required.

Fullerton made headlines again in 1999 when he challenged a patent on similar technology by a scientist at Lawrence Livermore National Laboratory. Eventually, "a University of California task force found that Lawrence Livermore National Laboratory officials and a former employee did not break any laws" but "did find fault with the way the lab handled the dispute and made 18 recommendations for improvement."

Other inventions by Fullerton include three patented Internet technology methods of linking, storing and transmitting information, a process for producing single layer graphene sheets, and a new magnetics technology that makes it possible to create programmable magnets that directly correlate with precision between magnet pairs. Fullerton applied for patents for a number of applications of the new magnetics technology, including a correlated magnetic container and a magnetic force profile system that uses coded magnet structures.

Fullerton founded Midsouth Technology in 1976 for the development of his high-technology developments. In 1987, he, with inventor Peter Petroff acting as a consultant, founded Time Domain Corporation to develop and market technologies such as ultra-wideband radio transmission technology. He also co-founded SoundBlast Technologies LLC in 2006 to develop his unique coherent detonation wave invention. His SoundBlast invention eliminates the deflagration process in the creation of a detonation wave in a short tube, enabling a timing accuracy of sub 20 μs. This timing accuracy allows for the assembly of very useful arrays of coherent detonation tubes. His detonation wave technology has applications in propulsion, weapons, and as a high energy impulse seismic source. In 2006, Fullerton and co-founder Mark Roberts founded start-up incubator Cedar Ridge Research in order to develop new technologies in a wide variety of fields. Programmable magnet technology was among those inventions.

Fullerton died on November 24, 2016, at the age of 65 from brain cancer.

== Awards ==
He won several prestigious awards for his inventions, including the Aviation Week & Space Technology Laureate award, a 2010 Popular Mechanics Breakthrough Award, and the HOBY Inspiration Award. In 2010 he was awarded a place on Fast Company's 100 Most Creative People in Business list, coming in at number 81.

He won an E-Week Award from the Institute of Electrical and Electronics Engineers Huntsville Section in 2000 and was made a Senior Member of The Institute of Electrical and Electronics Engineers, Inc., to honor his achievements in ultra-wideband technology.
