= Van der Waals integration =

van der Waals integration is a physical assembly strategy, in which prefabricated building blocks are physically assembled together through weak van der Waals interactions. This concept was originally proposed in two-dimensional materials research community to construct 2D van der Waals heterostructures.

A key benefit of van der Waals integration is that it offers an alternative way to integrate highly disparate material systems with unprecedented degrees of freedom, regardless of their crystal structures, lattice parameters, or orientation. As this physical assembly method does not involve one-to-one chemical bonds between adjacent layers, the van der Waals integration approach can thus enable the creation of a wide spectrum of series of artificial van der Waals heterostructures and novel moiré superlattices through layer transfer. Highly disparate material systems with diverse functionalities can be integrated together with atomically clean and electronically sharp interfaces, eliminating the rigorous lattice matching and process compatibility requirements that applied epitaxy. Epitaxial lift-off, mechanical spalling, and remote epitaxy can be applied to create freestanding nanomembranes. This approach has proven fruitful in 2D photonics, polariton physics, electrical contacts, hetero-integrated photonics, and wearable optoelectronic applications.
