= Magnetic catalysis =

Enhancement of dynamical symmetry breaking

Magnetic catalysis is a physics phenomenon, which is defined as an enhancement of dynamical symmetry breaking by an external magnetic field in quantum field theory, used for the description of quantum (quasi-)particles in particle physics, nuclear physics and condensed matter physics. The underlying phenomenon is a consequence of the strong tendency of a magnetic field to enhance binding of oppositely charged particles into bound states. The catalyzing effect comes from a partial restriction (dimensional reduction) of the motion of charged particles in the directions perpendicular to the direction of the magnetic field. Commonly, the magnetic catalysis is specifically associated with spontaneous breaking of flavor or chiral symmetry in quantum field theory, which is enhanced or triggered by the presence of an external magnetic field.

== General description ==
The underlying mechanism behind magnetic catalysis is the dimensional reduction of low-energy charged spin-1/2 particles. As a result of such a reduction, there exists a strong enhancement of the particle-antiparticle pairing responsible for symmetry breaking. For gauge theories in 3+1 space-time dimensions, such as quantum electrodynamics and quantum chromodynamics, the dimensional reduction leads to an effective (1+1)-dimensional low-energy dynamics. (Here the dimensionality of space-time is written as D+1 for D spatial directions.) In simple terms, the dimensional reduction reflects the fact that the motion of charged particles is (partially) restricted in the two space-like directions perpendicular to the magnetic field. However, this orbital motion constraint alone is not sufficient (for example, there is no dimensional reduction for charged scalar particles, carrying spin 0, although their orbital motion is constrained in the same way.) It is also important that the fermions have spin 1/2 and, as follows from the Atiyah–Singer index theorem, their lowest Landau level states have an energy independent of the magnetic field. (The corresponding energy vanishes in the case of massless particles.) This is in contrast to the energies in the higher Landau levels, which are proportional to the square root of the magnetic field. Therefore, if the field is sufficiently strong, only the lowest Landau level states are dynamically accessible at low energies. The states in the higher Landau levels decouple and become almost irrelevant. The phenomenon of magnetic catalysis has applications in particle physics, nuclear physics and condensed matter physics.

== Applications ==
=== Chiral symmetry breaking in quantum chromodynamics ===
In the theory of quantum chromodynamics, magnetic catalysis can be applied when quark matter is subject to extremely strong magnetic fields. Such strong magnetic fields can lead to more pronounced effects of chiral symmetry breaking, e.g., lead to (i) a larger value of the chiral condensate, (ii) a larger dynamical (constituent) mass of quarks, (iii) larger baryon masses, (iv) modified pion decay constant, etc. Recently, there was an increased activity to cross-check the effects of magnetic catalysis in the limit of a large number of colors, using the technique of AdS/CFT correspondence.

=== Quantum Hall effect in graphene ===
The idea of magnetic catalysis can be used to explain the observation of new quantum Hall plateaus in graphene in strong magnetic fields beyond the standard anomalous sequence at filling factors ν=4(n+½) where n is an integer. The additional quantum Hall plateaus develop at ν=0, ν=±1, ν=±3 and ν=±4.

The mechanism of magnetic catalysis in a relativistic-like planar systems such as graphene is very natural. In fact, it was originally proposed for a 2+1 dimensional model, which is almost the same as the low-energy effective theory of graphene written in terms of massless Dirac fermions. In application to a single layer of graphite (i.e., graphene), magnetic catalysis triggers the breakdown of an approximate internal symmetry and, thus, lifts the 4-fold degeneracy of Landau levels. It can be shown to occur for relativistic massless fermions with weak repulsive interactions.
