= Dirac spectrum =

Spectrum of eigenvalues

In mathematics, a Dirac spectrum, named after Paul Dirac, is the spectrum of eigenvalues of a Dirac operator on a Riemannian manifold with a spin structure. The isospectral problem for the Dirac spectrum asks whether two Riemannian spin manifolds have identical spectra. The Dirac spectrum depends on the spin structure in the sense that there exists a Riemannian manifold with two different spin structures that have different Dirac spectra.

== See also ==
- Can you hear the shape of a drum?
- Dirichlet eigenvalue
- Spectral asymmetry
- Angle-resolved photoemission spectroscopy
