= Nanoribbon =

Nanoribbon may refer to:

- Graphene nanoribbons
- Silicene nanoribbons
- Boron nitride nanoribbons
- Gallium(III) oxide nanoribbons
- titanate nanoribbons - see titanium dioxide
- Phosphorene nanoribbons
