= Electronic specific heat =

Heat capacity of an electron gas

In solid state physics the electronic specific heat, sometimes called the electron heat capacity, is the specific heat of an electron gas. Heat is transported by phonons and by free electrons in solids. For pure metals, however, the electronic contributions dominate in the thermal conductivity. In impure metals, the electron mean free path is reduced by collisions with impurities, and the phonon contribution may be comparable with the electronic contribution.

== Introduction ==
Although the Drude model was fairly successful in describing the electron motion within metals, it has some erroneous aspects: it predicts the Hall coefficient with the wrong sign compared to experimental measurements, the assumed additional electronic heat capacity to the lattice heat capacity, namely $\tfrac{3}{2} k_{\rm B}$ per electron at elevated temperatures, is also inconsistent with experimental values, since measurements of metals show no deviation from the Dulong–Petit law. The observed electronic contribution of electrons to the heat capacity is usually less than one percent of $\tfrac{3}{2} k_{\rm B}$. This problem seemed insoluble prior to the development of quantum mechanics. This paradox was solved by Arnold Sommerfeld after the discovery of the Pauli exclusion principle, who recognised that the replacement of the Boltzmann distribution with the Fermi–Dirac distribution was required and incorporated it in the free electron model.

== Derivation within the free electron model ==
=== Internal energy ===
When a metallic system is heated from absolute zero, not every electron gains an energy $k_{\rm B}T$ as equipartition dictates. Only those electrons in atomic orbitals within an energy range of $\tfrac{3}{2} k_{\rm B}T$ of the Fermi level are thermally excited. Electrons, in contrast to a classical gas, can only move into free states in their energetic neighbourhood. The one-electron energy levels are specified by the wave vector $k$ through the relation $\epsilon(k)=\hbar^2k^2/2m$ with $m$ the electron mass. This relation separates the occupied energy states from the unoccupied ones and corresponds to the spherical surface in k-space. As $T\rightarrow 0$ the ground state distribution becomes:

$$f = \begin{cases}
1 & \mbox{if } \epsilon_f<\mu, \\
0 & \mbox{if } \epsilon_f>\mu. \\
\end{cases}$$

where

- $f$ is the Fermi–Dirac distribution
- $\epsilon_f$ is the energy of the energy level corresponding to the ground state
- $\mu$ is the ground state energy in the limit $T\rightarrow 0$, which thus still deviates from the true ground state energy.

This implies that the ground state is the only occupied state for electrons in the limit $T\rightarrow 0$, the $f=1$ takes the Pauli exclusion principle into account. The internal energy $U$ of a system within the free electron model is given by the sum over one-electron levels times the mean number of electrons in that level:

$$U=2\sum_k \epsilon(\mathbf{k})f(\epsilon(\mathbf{k}))$$

where the factor of 2 accounts for the spin up and spin down states of the electron.

=== Reduced internal energy and electron density ===
Using the approximation that for a sum over a smooth function $F(k)$ over all allowed values of $k$ for finite large system is given by:

$$F(\mathbf{k})=\frac{V}{8\pi^3}\sum_k F(\mathbf{k})\Delta \mathbf{k}$$

where $V$ is the volume of the system.

For the reduced internal energy $u=U/V$ the expression for $U$ can be rewritten as:

$$u=\int \frac{d\mathbf{k}}{4\pi^3}\epsilon(\mathbf{k})f(\epsilon(\mathbf{k}))$$

and the expression for the electron density $n=\frac{N}{V}$ can be written as:

$$n=\int\frac{d\mathbf{k}}{4\pi^3}f(\epsilon(\mathbf{k}))$$

The integrals above can be evaluated using the fact that the dependence of the integrals on $\mathbf{k}$ can be changed to dependence on $\epsilon$ through the relation for the electronic energy when described as free particles, $\epsilon(k)=\hbar^2k^2/2m$, which yields for an arbitrary function $G$:

$$\int\frac{d\mathbf{k}}{4\pi^3}G(\epsilon(\mathbf{k})) = \int_0^\infty \frac{k^2dk}{\pi^2}G(\epsilon(\mathbf{k}))= \int_{-\infty}^\infty d\epsilon D(\epsilon)G(\epsilon)$$

with
$$D(\epsilon) = \begin{cases}
\frac{m}{\hbar^2\pi^2}\sqrt{\frac{2m\epsilon}{\hbar^2}} & \mbox{if } \epsilon>0, \\
0 & \mbox{if } \epsilon<0 \\
\end{cases}$$
which is known as the density of levels or density of states per unit volume such that $D(\epsilon) d \epsilon$ is the total number of states between $\epsilon$ and $\epsilon+ d\epsilon$ . Using the expressions above the integrals can be rewritten as:

$$\begin{align}
u&=\int_{-\infty}^\infty d\epsilon D(\epsilon)\epsilon f(\epsilon) \\
n&=\int_{-\infty}^\infty d\epsilon D(\epsilon)f(\epsilon)
\end{align}$$

These integrals can be evaluated for temperatures that are small compared to the Fermi temperature by applying the Sommerfeld expansion and using the approximation that $\mu$ differs from $\epsilon_f$ for $T=0$ by terms of order $T^2$. The expressions become:

$$\begin{align}
u&=\int_0^{\epsilon_f} \epsilon D(\epsilon)d\epsilon + \epsilon_f  \left(   (\mu-\epsilon_f )D(\epsilon_f)+ \frac{\pi^2}{6}(k_{\rm B}T)^2 \dot D(\epsilon_f)\right)  + \frac{\pi^2}{6}(k_{\rm B}T)^2 D(\epsilon_f)+ \mathcal{O}(T^4) \\
n&=\int_0^{\epsilon_f} D(\epsilon)d\epsilon +  \left(   (\mu-\epsilon_f )D(\epsilon_f)+ \frac{\pi^2}{6}(k_{\rm B}T)^2 \dot D(\epsilon_f)\right)
\end{align}$$

For the ground state configuration the first terms (the integrals) of the expressions above yield the internal energy and electron density of the ground state. The expression for the electron density reduces to $( \mu-\epsilon_f )D(\epsilon_f)+ \frac{\pi^2}{6}(k_{\rm B}T)^2 \dot D(\epsilon_f)=0$. Substituting this into the expression for the internal energy, one finds the following expression:

$$u=u_0+\frac{\pi^2}{6}(k_{\rm B}T)^2D(\epsilon_f)$$

=== Final expression ===
The contributions of electrons within the free electron model is given by:

$C_v=\left( \frac{\partial u}{\partial T} \right)_n = \frac{\pi^2}{3} k_{\rm B}^2TD(\epsilon_f)$, for free electrons : $C_V = C_v / n = \frac{\pi^2}{2} \frac{k_{\rm B}^2T}{\epsilon_f}$

Compared to the classical result ($C_V=\tfrac{3}{2}k_{\rm B}$), it can be concluded that this result is depressed by a factor of $\frac{\pi^2}{3} \frac{k_{\rm B}T}{\epsilon_f}$ which is at room temperature of order of magnitude $10^{-2}$. This explains the absence of an electronic contribution to the heat capacity as measured experimentally.

Note that in this derivation $\epsilon_f$ is often denoted by $E_{\rm F}$ which is known as the Fermi energy. In this notation, the electron heat capacity becomes:

$C_v= \frac{\pi^2}{3} k_{\rm B}^2TD(E_{\rm F})$ and for free electrons : $C_V = \frac{\pi^2}{2}k_{\rm B} \left( \frac{k_{\rm B}T}{E_{\rm F}} \right) = \frac{\pi^2}{2} k_{\rm B}\left( \frac{T}{T_{\rm F}} \right)$ using the definition for the Fermi energy with $T_{\rm F}$ the Fermi temperature.

== Comparison with experimental results for the heat capacity of metals ==
For temperatures below both the Debye temperature $T_{\rm D}$ and the Fermi temperature $T_{\rm F}$ the heat capacity of metals can be written as a sum of electron and phonon contributions that are linear and cubic respectively: $C_V=\gamma T +AT^3$. The coefficient $\gamma$ can be calculated and determined experimentally. We report this value below:

Species	Free electron value for $\gamma$ in $\rm mJ\;mol^{-1}K^{-2}$	Experimental value for $\gamma$ in $\rm mJ \;mol^{-1}K^{-2}$
Li	0.749	1.63
Be	0.500	0.17
Na	1.094	1.38
Mg	0.992	1.3
Al	0.912	1.35
K	1.668	2.08
Ca	1.511	2.9
Cu	0.505	0.695
Zn	0.753	0.64
Ga	1.025	0.596
Rb	1.911	2.41
Sr	1.790	3.6
Ag	0.645	0.646
Cd	0.948	0.688
In	1.233	1.69
Sn	1.410	1.78
Cs	2.238	3.20
Ba	1.937	2.7
Au	0.642	0.729
Hg	0.952	1.79
Ti	1.29	3.35
Pb	1.509	2.98

The free electrons in a metal do not usually lead to a strong deviation from the Dulong–Petit law at high temperatures. Since $\gamma$ is linear in $T$ and $A$ is linear in $T^3$, at low temperatures the lattice contribution vanishes faster than the electronic contribution and the latter can be measured. The deviation of the approximated and experimentally determined electronic contribution to the heat capacity of a metal is not too large. A few metals deviate significantly from this approximated prediction. Measurements indicate that these errors are associated with the electron mass being somehow changed in the metal, for the calculation of the electron heat capacity the effective mass of an electron should be considered instead. For Fe and Co the large deviations are attributed to the partially filled d-shells of these transition metals, whose d-bands lie at the Fermi energy. The alkali metals are expected to have the best agreement with the free electron model since these metals only one s-electron outside a closed shell. However even sodium, which is considered to be the closest to a free electron metal, is determined to have a $\gamma$ more than 25 per cent higher than expected from the theory.

Certain effects influence the deviation from the approximation:

- The interaction of the conduction electrons with the periodic potential of the rigid crystal lattice is neglected.
- The interaction of the conduction electrons with phonons is also neglected. This interaction causes changes in the effective mass of the electron and therefore it affects the electron energy.
- The interaction of the conduction electrons with themselves is also ignored. A moving electron causes an inertial reaction in the surrounding electron gas.

== Superconductors ==
Superconductivity occurs in many metallic elements of the periodic system and also in alloys, intermetallic compounds, and doped semiconductors. This effect occurs upon cooling the material. The entropy decreases on cooling below the critical temperature $T_c$ for superconductivity which indicates that the superconducting state is more ordered than the normal state. The entropy change is small, this must mean that only a very small fraction of electrons participate in the transition to the superconducting state but, the electronic contribution to the heat capacity changes drastically. There is a sharp jump of the heat capacity at the critical temperature while for the temperatures above the critical temperature the heat capacity is linear with temperature.

=== Derivation ===
The calculation of the electron heat capacity for super conductors can be done in the BCS theory. The entropy of a system of fermionic quasiparticles, in this case Cooper pairs, is:

$$S(T)=-2k_{\rm B} \sum_k[f_k \ln f_k +(1-f_k) \ln(1-f_k)]$$

where $f_k$ is the Fermi–Dirac distribution $f_k=\frac{1}{e^{\beta \omega_k}+1}$ with $\omega_k=\sqrt{\epsilon_k^2+\Delta_k(T)^2}$ and

- $\epsilon_k=E_K-\mu=\hbar^2\mathbf{k}^2/2m -\mu$ is the particle energy with respect to the Fermi energy
- $\Delta_k(T) =-\sum_{kk'}u_{k'}v_{k'}$ the energy gap parameter where $u_k$ and $v_k$ represents the probability that a Cooper pair is occupied or unoccupied respectively.

The heat capacity is given by $C_v(T)=T\frac{\partial S(T)}{\partial T}=T\sum_k \frac{\partial S}{\partial f_k}\frac{\partial f_k}{\partial T}$. The last two terms can be calculated:

$$\begin{align}
\frac{\partial S}{\partial f_k} &=-2k_{\rm B} \ln\frac{f_k}{1-f_k}=2\frac{1}{T} \sqrt{\epsilon_k^2+\Delta_k(T)^2}\\
\frac{\partial f_k}{\partial T} &= \frac{1}{k_{\rm B} T^2} \frac{e^{\beta \omega_k}}{(e^{\beta \omega_k}+1)^2}\left( \sqrt{\epsilon_k^2+\Delta_k(T)^2}-T\frac{\partial}{\partial T} \sqrt{\epsilon_k^2+\Delta_k(T)^2} \right) \end{align}$$

Substituting this in the expression for the heat capacity and again applying that the sum over $\mathbf{k}$ in the reciprocal space can be replaced by an integral in $\epsilon$ multiplied by the density of states $D(E_{\rm F})$ this yields:

$$C_v(T)=\frac{2D(E_{\rm F})}{k_{\rm B} T^2}\int^\infty_{-\infty} \left[ \frac{e^{\frac{\sqrt{\epsilon_k^2+\Delta_k(T)^2}}{k_{\rm B} T}}}{(e^{\frac{\sqrt{\epsilon_k^2+\Delta_k(T)^2}}{k_{\rm B} T}}+1)^2} \left( \epsilon_k^2 + \Delta_k(T)^2 -\frac{T}{2} \frac{\partial}{\partial T} \Delta_k(T)^2 \right) \right] d\epsilon_k$$

=== Characteristic behaviour for superconductors ===
To examine the typical behaviour of the electron heat capacity for species that can transition to the superconducting state, three regions must be defined:

1. Above the critical temperature $T>T_c$
2. At the critical temperature $T=T_c$
3. Below the critical temperature $T<T_c$

==== Superconductors at T > T _{c} ====
For $T>T_c$ it holds that $\Delta_k(T)=0$ and the electron heat capacity becomes:

$$C_v(T)=\frac{4D(E_{\rm F})}{k_{\rm B} T^2}\int^\infty_{-\infty}\frac{e^{\beta \epsilon}}{(e^{\beta \epsilon}+1)^2} \epsilon^2 d\epsilon=\frac{\pi^2}{3}D(E_{\rm F})k_{\rm B}^2T$$

This is just the result for a normal metal derived in the section above, as expected since a superconductor behaves as a normal conductor above the critical temperature.

==== Superconductors at T < T _{c} ====
For $T<T_c$ the electron heat capacity for super conductors exhibits an exponential decay of the form: $C_v(T)\approx e^{-\beta \Delta_k(0)}$

==== Superconductors at T = T _{c} ====
At the critical temperature the heat capacity is discontinuous. This discontinuity in the heat capacity indicates that the transition for a material from normal conducting to superconducting is a second order phase transition.

== See also ==
- Drude model
- Fermi–Dirac statistics
- Thermal effective mass
- Effective mass
- Superconductivity
- BCS theory

== Bibliography ==
- Kittel, Charles (2005). Introduction to Solid State Physics (8th ed.). Wiley. ISBN 978-0471415268.
- Ashcroft, N.W.; Mermin, N.D. (1976). Solid State Physics (1st ed.). Saunder. ISBN 978-0030493461.
- Ibach, Harald; Lüth, Hans (2009). Solid-State Physics: An Introduction to Principles of Materials Science (1st ed.). Springer. ISBN 978-3540938033.
- Grosso, G.; Parravicini, G.P. (2000). Solid State Physics (1st ed.). Academic Press. ISBN 978-0123044600.
- Rosenberg, H.M. (1963). Low temperature solid state physics; some selected topics (1st ed.). Oxford at the Clarendon Press. ISBN 978-1114116481.
- Hofmann, P. (2002). Solid State Physics (2nd ed.). Wiley. ISBN 978-3527412822.
