= Drude model =

Model of electrical conduction

Drude model electrons (shown here in blue) constantly bounce between heavier, stationary crystal ions (shown in red).

The Drude model or the Drude–Lorentz model of electrical conduction in metals was proposed in 1900 by Paul Drude, and refined by Hendrik Lorentz in 1905. The Drude model attempts to explain conduction in terms of the scattering of electrons (the carriers of electricity) by the relatively immobile ions in the metal that act like obstructions to the flow of electrons. The model is an application of kinetic theory. It assumes that when electrons in a solid are exposed to the electric field, they behave much like a pinball machine. The sea of constantly jittering electrons bouncing and re-bouncing off heavier, relatively immobile positive ions produce a net collective motion in the direction opposite to the applied electric field.

In modern terms this is reflected in the valence electron model where the sea of electrons is composed of the valence electrons only, and not the full set of electrons available in the solid, and the scattering centers are the inner shells of tightly bound electrons to the nucleus. The scattering centers had a positive charge equivalent to the valence number of the atoms. This similarity added to some computation errors in the Drude paper, ended up providing a reasonable qualitative theory of solids capable of making good predictions in certain cases and giving completely wrong results in others. Whenever people tried to give more substance and detail to the nature of the scattering centers, and the mechanics of scattering, and the meaning of the length of scattering, all these attempts ended in failures.

The scattering lengths computed in the Drude model, are of the order of 10 to 100 interatomic distances, and also these could not be given proper microscopic explanations.

The model gives better predictions for metals, especially in regards to conductivity, and sometimes is called Drude theory of metals. This is because metals have essentially a better approximation to the free electron model, i.e. metals do not have complex band structures, electrons behave essentially as free particles and where, in the case of metals, the effective number of de-localized electrons is essentially the same as the valence number.

The two most significant results of the Drude model are an electronic equation of motion,
$$\frac{d}{dt}\langle\mathbf{p}(t)\rangle = q\left(\mathbf{E}+\frac{\langle\mathbf{p}(t)\rangle}{m} \times\mathbf{B} \right) - \frac{\langle\mathbf{p}(t)\rangle}{\tau},$$
and a linear relationship between current density J and electric field E,
$$\mathbf{J} = \frac{n q^2 \tau}{m} \, \mathbf{E}.$$

Here t is the time, ⟨p⟩ is the average momentum per electron and q, n, m, and τ are respectively the electron charge, number density, mass, and mean free time between ionic collisions. The latter expression is particularly important because it explains in semi-quantitative terms why Ohm's law, one of the most ubiquitous relationships in all of electromagnetism, should hold.

== History ==
In 1853, Gustav Wiedemann and Rudolph Franz found that the ratio between thermal conductivity of a material and its electrical conductivity was universal, this relation became known as Wiedemann–Franz law. In 1881, Ludvig Lorenz also discussed the temperature dependence of the ratio and the proportionality constant became known as the Lorenz constant. In 1897, J. J. Thomson discovered the electron.

German physicist Paul Drude worked on problems related to optics in his 1887 dissertation, under the supervision of Woldemar Voigt. After several experiments, he tried to explain the optical and electrical properties of solids using equations of motion in his 1899 paper. Inspired by Thomson theory, Paul Drude proposed his microscopic model of metals in February 1900 (a second paper was published in September). He assumed a simplistic model of the solid: positively charged scattering centers and a gas of electrons, giving an electrically neutral solid, using the kinetic theory of gases. His model was able to derive Wiedemann–Franz law.

In August, Drude also presented his work at the 1900 International Congress of Physics during the Exposition Universelle in Paris. During the congress he defended the existence of electrons which was still under debate. Independently of Drude, J. J. Thomson had derived and presented an almost identical model.

=== Reinganum criticism and Einstein–Drude correspondence ===
Right after publication of Drude's paper, Max Reinganum pointed out that there was an issue with the specific heat and that was not in accordance Dulong–Petit law.

In 1901, Albert Einstein, during his doctorate studies, wrote a letter to Drude to question the statistical basis of his model. The letters were never found but their content is partially reconstructed from Einstein correspondence with Mileva Marić. Einstein first objection concerned a gap in Ludwig Boltzmann's statistical mechanics, to which Drude responded in defense of Boltzmann. The second objection was made but its content is missing. Following their interaction, Einstein ended up writing a paper on statistical mechanics in 1902.

=== Lorentz refinement ===
Hendrik Antoon Lorentz worked the role of the electron in his Lorentz ether theory and in his Lorentz oscillator model. In 1903, he used the Drude model to derive Planck's law in the long wavelength limit. In a talk in Berlin in 1904, he presented a refined Drude model which he published in 1905 and hence is also known as the Drude–Lorentz model). He introduced the effects of the electric field and temperature in a self-consistent way. Rudolf Seeliger considered that Lorentz had managed "for electron statistics the same as Boltzmann and [James Clerk] Maxwell had accomplished in their time by their extension of the original equations of [Rudolf] Clausius."

Lorentz also corrected a factor of 2 in Drude's derivation of Wiedemann–Franz law, which led to a less accurate prediction.

=== Further criticism ===
In 1906, Richard Gans found that Drude model was not nearly accurate with respect to his Hall effect experiments, specially with respect to the sign of the Hall coefficient. By 1911, Karl Baedeker published that the Drude model was inaccurate for all galvanomagnetic phenomena. The same year Niels Bohr also showed in his thesis that (according to Bohr–Van Leeuwen theorem) that Drude model could not explain diamagnetism in metals. This led him to formulate his Bohr model of the atom.

The consensus in 1911 was also that there was an issue with the specific heat predicted by Drude's model. The prediction was either wrong or the contribution of electrons to the specific heat was negligible. In 1912 in his Debye model, Peter Debye showed that the behaviour of the specific heat at low temperatures could be explained by the contribution of the lattice using the recently developed quantum theory.

Wilhelm Wien wrote in 1913 that the Drude model started being the source of false speculations. He considered that "the question of thermal conduction and its connection with quantum theory does not appear to be developed to the point where a theory can be formulated."

In 1924, the fourth Solvay Conference was organized about the problems with the Drude model. About this time, theories of degeneracy were being discussed In 1924, Einstein working with Satyendra Nath Bose, tried to apply the recently developed Bose–Einstein statistics to electrons in a metal but he showed it was not compatible. In 1925, Wolfgang Pauli proposed the exclusion principle for electrons. Enrico Fermi and Paul Dirac came independently with Fermi–Dirac statistics in 1926. Specially Fermi was motivated by the failures of the Drude model.

=== Succeeding model ===
Drude used Maxwell–Boltzmann statistics for the gas of electrons and for deriving the model, which was the only one available at that time. By replacing the statistics with the correct Fermi Dirac statistics, Arnold Sommerfeld created the free electron model in 1927, significantly improving the predictions. Sommerfeld theory agreed more accurate with the experimental value for the Lorenz number. He also solved the specific heat problem. He presented his condensed theory during the Como Conference.

== Assumptions ==
Drude used the kinetic theory of gases applied to the gas of electrons moving on a fixed background of "ions"; this is in contrast with the usual way of applying the theory of gases as a neutral diluted gas with no background. The number density of the electron gas was assumed to be
$$n  = \frac{N_\text{A} Z \rho_\text{m}}{A},$$
where Z is the effective number of de-localized electrons per ion, for which Drude used the valence number, A is the atomic mass per mole, $\rho_\text{m}$ is the mass density (mass per unit volume) of the "ions", and N_{A} is the Avogadro constant. Considering the average volume available per electron as a sphere:
$$\frac{V}{N} = \frac{1}{n} = \frac{4}{3} \pi r_{\rm s}^3 .$$
The quantity $r_\text{s}$ is a parameter that describes the electron density and is often of the order of 2 or 3 times the Bohr radius, for alkali metals it ranges from 3 to 6 and some metal compounds it can go up to 10. The densities are of the order of 1000 times of a typical classical gas.

The core assumptions made in the Drude model are the following:

- Drude applied the kinetic theory of a dilute gas, despite the high densities, therefore ignoring electron–electron and electron–ion interactions aside from collisions.
- The Drude model considers the metal to be formed of a collection of positively charged ions from which a number of "free electrons" were detached. These may be thought to be the valence electrons of the atoms that have become delocalized due to the electric field of the other atoms.
- The Drude model neglects long-range interaction between the electron and the ions or between the electrons; this is called the independent electron approximation.
- The electrons move in straight lines between one collision and another; this is called free electron approximation.
- The only interaction of a free electron with its environment was treated as being collisions with the impenetrable ions core.
- The average time between subsequent collisions of such an electron is τ, with a memoryless Poisson distribution. The nature of the collision partner of the electron does not matter for the calculations and conclusions of the Drude model.
- After a collision event, the distribution of the velocity and direction of an electron is determined by only the local temperature and is independent of the velocity of the electron before the collision event. The electron is considered to be immediately at equilibrium with the local temperature after a collision.

Removing or improving upon each of these assumptions gives more refined models, that can more accurately describe different solids:

- Improving the hypothesis of the Maxwell–Boltzmann statistics with the Fermi–Dirac statistics leads to the Drude–Sommerfeld model.
- Improving the hypothesis of the Maxwell–Boltzmann statistics with the Bose–Einstein statistics leads to considerations about the specific heat of integer spin atoms and to the Bose–Einstein condensate.
- A valence band electron in a semiconductor is still essentially a free electron in a delimited energy range (i.e. only a "rare" high energy collision that implies a change of band would behave differently); the independent electron approximation is essentially still valid (i.e. no electron–electron scattering), where instead the hypothesis about the localization of the scattering events is dropped (in layman terms the electron is and scatters all over the place).

== Mathematical treatment ==
=== DC field ===
The simplest analysis of the Drude model assumes that electric field E is both uniform and constant, and that the thermal velocity of electrons is sufficiently high such that they accumulate only an infinitesimal amount of momentum dp between collisions, which occur on average every τ seconds.

Then an electron isolated at time t will on average have been travelling for time τ since its last collision, and consequently will have accumulated momentum
$$\Delta\langle\mathbf{p}\rangle= q \mathbf{E} \tau.$$

During its last collision, this electron will have been just as likely to have bounced forward as backward, so all prior contributions to the electron's momentum may be ignored, resulting in the expression
$$\langle\mathbf{p}\rangle = q \mathbf{E} \tau.$$

Substituting the relations
$$\begin{align}
\langle\mathbf{p}\rangle &= m \langle\mathbf{v}\rangle, \\
\mathbf{J} &= n q \langle\mathbf{v}\rangle,
\end{align}$$
results in the formulation of Ohm's law mentioned above:
$$\mathbf{J} = \frac{n q^2 \tau}{m} \mathbf{E}.$$

=== Time-varying analysis ===
Drude response of current density to an AC electric field.

The dynamics may also be described by introducing an effective drag force. At time t = t_{0} + dt the electron's momentum will be:
$$\mathbf{p}(t_0+dt) = \left( 1 - \frac{dt}{\tau} \right) \left[\mathbf{p}(t_0) + \mathbf{f}(t) dt + O(dt^2)\right] + \frac{dt}{\tau} \left(\mathbf{g}(t_0) + \mathbf{f}(t) dt + O(dt^2)\right)$$
where $\mathbf{f}(t)$ can be interpreted as generic force (e.g. Lorentz force) on the carrier or more specifically on the electron. $\mathbf{g}(t_0)$ is the momentum of the carrier with random direction after the collision (i.e. with a momentum $\langle\mathbf{g}(t_0)\rangle = 0$) and with absolute kinetic energy
$$\frac{\langle|\mathbf{g}(t_0)|\rangle^2}{2m} = \frac{3}{2} KT.$$

On average, a fraction of $\textstyle 1-\frac{dt}{\tau}$ of the electrons will not have experienced another collision, the other fraction that had the collision on average will come out in a random direction and will contribute to the total momentum to only a factor $\textstyle \frac{dt}{\tau}\mathbf{f}(t)dt$ which is of second order.

With a bit of algebra and dropping terms of order $dt^2$, this results in the generic differential equation
$$\frac{d}{dt}\mathbf{p}(t) = \mathbf{f}(t) - \frac{\mathbf{p}(t)}{\tau}$$

The second term is actually an extra drag force or damping term due to the Drude effects.

=== Constant electric field ===
At time t = t_{0} + dt the average electron's momentum will be
$$\langle\mathbf{p}(t_0+dt)\rangle=\left( 1 - \frac{dt}{\tau} \right) \left(\langle\mathbf{p}(t_0)\rangle + q\mathbf{E} \, dt\right),$$
and then
$$\frac{d}{dt}\langle\mathbf{p}(t)\rangle = q\mathbf{E} - \frac{\langle\mathbf{p}(t)\rangle}{\tau},$$
where ⟨p⟩ denotes average momentum and q the charge of the electrons. This, which is an inhomogeneous differential equation, may be solved to obtain the general solution of
$$\langle\mathbf{p}(t)\rangle = q \tau \mathbf{E}(1-e^{-t/\tau}) + \langle\mathbf{p}(0)\rangle e^{-t/\tau}$$
for p(t). The steady state solution, d/dt⟨p⟩ = 0, is then
$$\langle\mathbf{p}\rangle = q \tau \mathbf{E}.$$

As above, average momentum may be related to average velocity and this in turn may be related to current density,
$$\begin{align}
\langle\mathbf{p}\rangle &= m \langle\mathbf{v}\rangle, \\
\mathbf{J} &= n q \langle\mathbf{v}\rangle,
\end{align}$$
and the material can be shown to satisfy Ohm's law $\mathbf{J} = \sigma_0 \mathbf{E}$ with a DC-conductivity σ_{0}:
$$\sigma_0 = \frac{n q^2 \tau}{m}$$

=== AC field ===
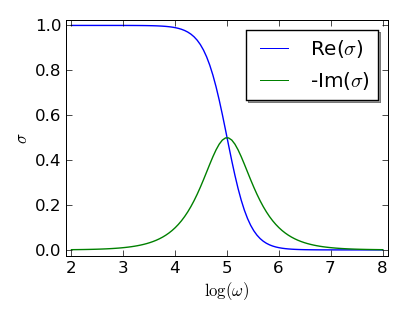
Complex conductivity for different frequencies assuming that τ = 10^{−5} and that σ_{0} = 1.

The Drude model can also predict the current as a response to a time-dependent electric field with an angular frequency ω. The complex conductivity is
$$\sigma(\omega) = \frac{\sigma_0}{1 - i\omega\tau}= \frac{\sigma_0}{1 + \omega^2\tau^2}+ i\omega\tau\frac{\sigma_0}{1 + \omega^2\tau^2}.$$

Here it is assumed that:
$$\begin{align}
E(t) &= \Re{\left(E_0 e^{-i\omega t}\right)}; \\
J(t) &= \Re\left(\sigma(\omega) E_0 e^{-i\omega t}\right).
\end{align}$$
In engineering, i is generally replaced by −i (or −j) in all equations, which reflects the phase difference with respect to origin, rather than delay at the observation point traveling in time.

Proof using the equation of motion

Given
$$\begin{align}
\mathbf{p}(t) &= \Re{\left(\mathbf{p}(\omega) e^{-i\omega t}\right)} \\
\mathbf{E}(t) &= \Re{\left(\mathbf{E}(\omega) e^{-i\omega t}\right)}
\end{align}$$
And the equation of motion above
$$\frac{d}{dt}\mathbf{p}(t) = -e\mathbf{E} - \frac{\mathbf{p}(t)}{\tau}$$
substituting
$$-i\omega\mathbf{p}(\omega) = -e\mathbf{E}(\omega) - \frac{\mathbf{p}(\omega)}{\tau}$$
Given
$$\begin{align}
\mathbf{j} &= - n e \frac{\mathbf{p}}{m} \\
\mathbf{j}(t) &= \Re{\left(\mathbf{j}(\omega) e^{-i\omega t}\right)} \\
\mathbf{j}(\omega) &= - n e \frac{\mathbf{p}(\omega)}{m}=\frac{(n e^2/m)\mathbf{E}(\omega)}{1/\tau -i \omega}
\end{align}$$
defining the complex conductivity from:
$$\mathbf{j}(\omega) = \sigma(\omega)\mathbf{E}(\omega)$$
We have:
$$\sigma(\omega) = \frac{\sigma_0}{1-i\omega\tau};\sigma_0=\frac{ne^2\tau}{m}$$

The imaginary part indicates that the current lags behind the electrical field. This happens because the electrons need roughly a time τ to accelerate in response to a change in the electrical field. Here the Drude model is applied to electrons; it can be applied both to electrons and holes; i.e., positive charge carriers in semiconductors. The curves for σ(ω) are shown in the graph.

If a sinusoidally varying electric field with frequency $\omega$ is applied to the solid, the negatively charged electrons behave as a plasma that tends to move a distance x apart from the positively charged background. As a result, the sample is polarized and there will be an excess charge at the opposite surfaces of the sample.

The dielectric constant of the sample is expressed as
$$\varepsilon_r = \frac {D}{\varepsilon_0 E} = 1 + \frac {P}{\varepsilon_0 E}$$
where $D$ is the electric displacement and $P$ is the polarization density.

The polarization density is written as
$$P(t) = \Re{\left(P_0e^{i\omega t}\right)}$$
and the polarization density with n electron density is
$$P = - n e x$$
After a little algebra the relation between polarization density and electric field can be expressed as
$$P = - \frac{ne^2}{m\omega^2} E$$
The frequency dependent dielectric function of the solid is
$$\varepsilon_r(\omega) = 1 - \frac {n e^2}{\varepsilon_0m \omega^2}$$

Proof using Maxwell's equations

Given the approximations for the $\sigma(\omega)$ included above

- we assumed no electromagnetic field: this is always smaller by a factor v/c given the additional Lorentz term $- \frac {e \mathbf{p}}{mc} \times \mathbf{B}$ in the equation of motion
- we assumed spatially uniform field: this is true if the field does not oscillate considerably across a few mean free paths of electrons. This is typically not the case: the mean free path is of the order of Angstroms corresponding to wavelengths typical of X rays.

The following are Maxwell's equations without sources (which are treated separately in the scope of plasma oscillations), in Gaussian units:
$$\begin{align}
\nabla \cdot \mathbf{E} &= 0; & \nabla \cdot \mathbf{B} &= 0; \\
\nabla \times \mathbf{E} &= - \frac{1}{c}\frac{\partial \mathbf{B}}{\partial t}; & \nabla \times \mathbf{B} &= \frac{4\pi}{c}\mathbf{j} + \frac{1}{c}\frac{\partial \mathbf{E}}{\partial t}.
\end{align}$$
Then
$$\nabla \times \nabla \times \mathbf{E} = - \nabla^2 \mathbf{E} = \frac{i \omega}{c} \nabla \times \mathbf{B} = \frac{i \omega}{c} \left( \frac{4\pi \sigma}{c} \mathbf{E} - \frac{i \omega}{c} \mathbf{E} \right)$$
or
$$-\nabla^2 \mathbf{E} = \frac{\omega^2}{c^2}  \left( 1 + \frac {4\pi i \sigma}{\omega}\right) \mathbf{E}$$
which is an electromagnetic wave equation for a continuous homogeneous medium with dielectric constant $\varepsilon(\omega)$ in the Helmholtz form
$$- \nabla^2 \mathbf{E} = \frac{\omega^2}{c^2} \varepsilon(\omega) \mathbf{E}$$
where the refractive index is $n(\omega) = \sqrt{\varepsilon(\omega)}$ and the phase velocity is $v_\text{p} = \frac{c}{n(\omega)}$ therefore the complex dielectric constant is
$$\varepsilon(\omega) = \left( 1 + \frac {4\pi i \sigma}{\omega}\right)$$
which in the case $\omega\tau \gg 1$ can be approximated to:
$$\varepsilon(\omega) = \left( 1 - \frac{\omega_{\rm p}^2}{\omega^2} \right); \omega_{\rm p}^2 = \frac {4\pi n e^2}{m}  \text{(Gaussian units)}.$$
In SI units the $4 \pi$ in the numerator is replaced by $\varepsilon_0$ in the denominator and the dielectric constant is written as $\varepsilon_r$.

At a resonance frequency $\omega_{\rm p}$, called the plasma frequency, the dielectric function changes sign from negative to positive and real part of the dielectric function drops to zero.
$$\omega_{\rm p} = \sqrt{\frac{n e^2}{\varepsilon_0 m}}$$
The plasma frequency represents a plasma oscillation resonance or plasmon. The plasma frequency can be employed as a direct measure of the square root of the density of valence electrons in a solid. Observed values are in reasonable agreement with this theoretical prediction for a large number of materials. Below the plasma frequency, the dielectric function is negative and the field cannot penetrate the sample. Light with angular frequency below the plasma frequency will be totally reflected. Above the plasma frequency the light waves can penetrate the sample, a typical example is alkaline metals that becomes transparent in the range of ultraviolet radiation.

=== Thermal conductivity of metals ===
One great success of the Drude model is the explanation of the Wiedemann-Franz law. This was due to a fortuitous cancellation of errors in Drude's original calculation. Drude predicted the value of the Lorenz number:
$$\frac {\kappa}{\sigma T} = \frac{3}{2}\left(\frac{k_{\rm B}}{e}\right)^2 = 1.11 \times 10^{-8} \, \mathrm{W{\cdot}\Omega/K^2}$$
Experimental values are typically in the range of $2-3 \times 10^{-8} ~ \mathrm{W{\cdot}\Omega/K^2}$ for metals at temperatures between 0 and 100 degrees Celsius.

Derivation and Drude's errors

Solids can conduct heat through the motion of electrons, atoms, and ions. Conductors have a large density of free electrons whereas insulators do not; ions may be present in either. Given the good electrical and thermal conductivity in metals and the poor electrical and thermal conductivity in insulators, a natural starting point to estimate the thermal conductivity is to calculate the contribution of the conduction electrons.

The thermal current density is the flux per unit time of thermal energy across a unit area perpendicular to the flow. It is proportional to the temperature gradient.
$$\mathbf{j}_q = - \kappa \nabla T$$
where $\kappa$ is the thermal conductivity. In a one-dimensional wire, the energy of electrons depends on the local temperature $\varepsilon[T(x)]$ If we imagine a temperature gradient in which the temperature decreases in the positive x-direction, the average electron velocity is zero (but not the average speed). The electrons arriving at location x from the higher-energy side will arrive with energies $\varepsilon[T(x-v\tau)]$, while those from the lower-energy side will arrive with energies $\varepsilon[T(x+v\tau)]$. Here, $v$ is the average speed of electrons and $\tau$ is the average time since the last collision.

The net flux of thermal energy at location x is the difference between what passes from left to right and from right to left:
$$\mathbf{j}_q  = \frac{1}{2} n v \big( \varepsilon[T(x-v\tau)] - \varepsilon[T(x+v\tau)] \big)$$
The factor of 1/2 accounts for the fact that electrons are equally likely to be moving in either direction. Only half contribute to the flux at x.

When the mean free path $\ell = v \tau$ is small, the quantity $\big( \varepsilon[T(x-v\tau)] - \varepsilon[T(x+v\tau)] \big) / 2 v \tau$ can be approximated by a derivative with respect to x. This gives
$$\mathbf{j}_q  = n v^2 \tau \frac {d \varepsilon}{dT} \cdot \left(-\frac{dT}{dx} \right)$$
Since the electron moves in the $x$, $y$, and $z$ directions, the mean square velocity in the $x$ direction is $\langle v_x^2 \rangle = \tfrac{1}{3} \langle v^2 \rangle$. We also have $n \frac {d\varepsilon}{dT}=\frac{N}{V}\frac {d\varepsilon}{dT} = \frac{1}{V} \frac {dE}{dT} = c_v$, where $c_v$ is the specific heat capacity of the material.

Putting all of this together, the thermal energy current density is
$$\mathbf{j}_q  = -\frac{1}{3} v^2 \tau c_v \nabla T$$
This determines the thermal conductivity:
$$\kappa = \frac{1}{3} v^2 \tau c_v$$
(This derivation ignores the temperature-dependence, and hence the position-dependence, of the speed v. This will not introduce a significant error unless the temperature changes rapidly over a distance comparable to the mean free path.)

Dividing the thermal conductivity $\kappa$ by the electrical conductivity $\sigma = \frac{n e^2 \tau} {m}$ eliminates the scattering time $\tau$ and gives
$$\frac{\kappa}{\sigma} = \frac{c_v m v^2}{3n e^2}$$

At this point of the calculation, Drude made two assumptions now known to be errors. First, he used the classical result for the specific heat capacity of the conduction electrons: $c_v= \tfrac{3}{2}n k_{\rm B}$. This overestimates the electronic contribution to the specific heat capacity by a factor of roughly 100. Second, Drude used the classical mean square velocity for electrons, $\tfrac{1}{2}mv^2=\tfrac{3}{2}k_{\rm B} T$. This underestimates the energy of the electrons by a factor of roughly 100. The cancellation of these two errors results in a good approximation to the conductivity of metals. In addition to these two estimates, Drude also made a statistical error and overestimated the mean time between collisions by a factor of 2. This confluence of errors gave a value for the Lorenz number that was remarkably close to experimental values.

The correct value of the Lorenz number as estimated from the Drude model is
$$\frac {\kappa}{\sigma T} = \frac{3}{2}\left(\frac{k_{\rm B}}{e}\right)^2 = 1.11 \times 10^{-8} \, \text{W}\Omega/\text{K}^2.$$

=== Thermopower ===
A generic temperature gradient when switched on in a thin bar will trigger a current of electrons towards the lower temperature side, given the experiments are done in an open circuit manner this current will accumulate on that side generating an electric field countering the electric current. This field is called thermoelectric field:
$$\mathbf{E} = Q \nabla T$$
and Q is called thermopower. The estimates by Drude are a factor of 100 low given the direct dependency with the specific heat.
$$Q = - \frac{c_v}{3ne} = - \frac{k_{\rm B}}{2e} = 0.43 \times 10^{-4} \mathrm{~V/K}$$
where the typical thermopowers at room temperature are 100 times smaller, of the order of microvolts.

Proof together with the Drude errors

From the simple one dimensional model
$$v_Q=\frac{1}{2}[v(x-v\tau)-v(x+v\tau)]=-v \tau \frac {dv}{dx}= - \tau \frac {d}{dx}\left(\frac{v^2}{2}\right)$$
Expanding to 3 degrees of freedom $\langle v_x^2 \rangle = \frac{1}{3} \langle v^2 \rangle$
$$\mathbf{v_Q}=- \frac {\tau}{6} \frac {dv^2}{dT} (\nabla T)$$
The mean velocity due to the Electric field (given the equation of motion above at equilibrium)
$$\mathbf{v_E}=- \frac {e \mathbf{E} \tau}{m}$$
To have a total current null $\mathbf{v_E} + \mathbf{v_Q} = 0$ we have
$$Q = - \frac{1}{3e}\frac {d}{dT}\left(\frac{mv^2}{2}\right) = - \frac{c_v}{3ne}$$
And as usual in the Drude case $c_v=\frac{3}{2}nk_{\rm B}$
$$Q = - \frac{k_{\rm B}}{2e} = 0.43 \times 10^{-4}~\mathrm{V/K}$$
where the typical thermopowers at room temperature are 100 times smaller of the order of microvolts.

== Accuracy of the model ==
The Drude model provides a very good explanation of DC and AC conductivity in metals, the Hall effect, and the magnetoresistance in metals near room temperature. The model also explains partly the Wiedemann–Franz law of 1853.

Drude formula is derived in a limited way, namely by assuming that the charge carriers form a classical ideal gas. When quantum theory is considered, the Drude model can be extended to the free electron model, where the carriers follow Fermi–Dirac distribution. The conductivity predicted is the same as in the Drude model because it does not depend on the form of the electronic speed distribution. However, Drude's model greatly overestimates the electronic heat capacity of metals. In reality, metals and insulators have roughly the same heat capacity at room temperature. Also, the Drude model does not explain the scattered trend of electrical conductivity versus frequency above roughly 2 THz.

The model can also be applied to positive (hole) charge carriers.

=== Drude response in real materials ===
The characteristic behavior of a Drude metal in the time or frequency domain, i.e. exponential relaxation with time constant τ or the frequency dependence for σ(ω) stated above, is called Drude response. In a conventional, simple, real metal (e.g. sodium, silver, or gold at room temperature) such behavior is not found experimentally, because the characteristic frequency τ^{−1} is in the infrared frequency range, where other features that are not considered in the Drude model (such as band structure) play an important role. But for certain other materials with metallic properties, frequency-dependent conductivity was found that closely follows the simple Drude prediction for σ(ω). These are materials where the relaxation rate τ^{−1} is at much lower frequencies. This is the case for certain doped semiconductor single crystals, high-mobility two-dimensional electron gases, and heavy-fermion metals.

== See also ==
- Free electron model
- Arnold Sommerfeld
- Electrical conductivity

=== General ===
- Ashcroft, Neil; Mermin, N. David (1976). Solid State Physics. New York: Holt, Rinehart and Winston. ISBN 978-0-03-083993-1.
- Kittel, Charles (2005). Introduction to Solid State Physics (8th ed.). John Wiley & Sons Inc. ISBN 0-471-41526-X.
- Ziman, J.M. (1972). Principles of the theory of solids (2nd ed.). Cambridge university press. ISBN 0-521-29733-8.
