= Boojum (superfluidity) =

Monopole Singularity Phenomenon

In the physics of superfluidity, a boojum is a geometric pattern on the surface of one of the phases of superfluid helium-3, whose motion can result in the decay of a supercurrent. A boojum can result from a monopole singularity in the bulk of the liquid being drawn to, and then "pinned" on a surface. Although superfluid helium-3 only exists within a few thousandths of a degree of absolute zero, boojums have also been observed forming in various liquid crystals, which exist at a far broader range of temperatures.

The boojum was named by N. David Mermin of Cornell University in 1976. He was inspired by Lewis Carroll's poem The Hunting of the Snark. As in the poem, the appearance of a boojum can cause something (in this case, the supercurrent) to "softly and suddenly vanish away". Other, less whimsical names had already been suggested for the phenomenon, but Mermin was persistent. After an exchange of letters that Mermin describes as both "lengthy and hilarious", the editors of Physical Review Letters agreed to his terminology. Research using the term "boojum" in a superfluid context was first published in 1977, and the term has since gained widespread acceptance in broader areas of physics. Its Russian phonetic equivalent is "budzhum", which is also well accepted by physicists.

The plural of the term is "boojums", a word initially disliked by Mermin (who at first used "booja") but one which is defined unambiguously by Carroll in his poem.
