= Thermal effective mass =

The thermal effective mass of electrons in a metal is the apparent mass due to interactions with the periodic potential of the crystal lattice, with phonons (e.g. phonon drag), and interaction with other electrons. The resulting effective mass of electrons contributes to the electronic heat capacity of the metal, leading to deviations from the heat capacity of a free electron gas.
