= Daniel S. Rokhsar =

American professor

Daniel S. Rokhsar is a professor in the departments of Physics and of Molecular and Cell Biology at University of California, Berkeley and Head of the Plant Genomics Program at the Joint Genome Institute of the United States Department of Energy. His research is focused on understanding the origin, evolution, and diversity of animals by combining computational genome analysis with comparative developmental biology. Rokhsar received his Ph.D. in theoretical physics from Cornell University with doctoral advisors N. David Mermin and James Sethna, and joined the Berkeley faculty in 1989.

== Awards ==
As a teenager, Rokhsar was one of the winners in the Westinghouse Science Talent Search.

Rokhsar was awarded a Guggenheim Fellowship in 2000.
