= Sandra Troian =

American applied physicist

Sandra Marina Troian (born 1957) is an American applied physicist known for her research on fluid dynamics, quasicrystals, surface science, thin films, microfluidics, and spacecraft micropropulsion. She is a professor of Applied Physics, Aeronautics, and Mechanical Engineering in the Division of Engineering and Applied Science of the California Institute of Technology (Caltech), and head of the Laboratory of Interfacial and Small Scale Transport in the Department of Applied Physics and Materials Science at Caltech.

== Research ==
The Thompson and Troian slip condition, a model for nonlinear flow of liquids at liquid-solid interfaces, is named for Troian's discovery of this model with physicist Peter Thompson, which they published in Nature in 1997. Her research has also included methods for controlling microscopic fluid droplets using a combination of chemical patterns and temperature variations on surfaces, rather than by using microfluidic pumps, published in Nature in 2000. In 2009, she found a model to explain the spontaneous growth of arrays of nanoscale pillars in polymer films placed between the surfaces of silicon wafers, allowing this phenomenon to be controlled and used for nanoscale construction.

== Education and career ==
Troian graduated from Harvard University in 1980. She completed her Ph.D. at Cornell University in 1987. Her dissertation, Mean Field Theories of Icosahedral Quasicrytals, was supervised by N. David Mermin.

After postdoctoral work at Exxon Research, and at the Collège de France working with Pierre-Gilles de Gennes, she returned to Exxon as a staff scientist. She joined the faculty at Princeton University as an assistant professor of chemical engineering in 1993, visited Caltech as a Moore Distinguished Scholar in 2004, and moved to Caltech in 2006.

== Whistleblower suit ==
In 2014, Troian filed a whistleblower lawsuit against the Caltech administration, claiming that they retaliated against her for reporting to the federal authorities a case of suspected espionage by an Israeli postdoctoral researcher in her laboratory. The alleged retaliation included an investigation against her for academic misconduct over an incident in which she listed her pet cat Pucci as a coauthor on a paper, following a tradition of similar pet coauthorships by other well-known physicists.

== Recognition ==
Troian and her coauthor Anne Dussaud were the 1999 winners of the François Frenkiel Award for Fluid Mechanics of the American Physical Society (APS) Division of Fluid Dynamics.

Troian was named a Fellow of the American Physical Society in 2005, after a nomination by the APS Division of Fluid Dynamics, "for pioneering theoretical, experimental and molecular simulation studies of micro-hydrodynamic flows".
