= Quantum refereed game =

Class of games in quantum game theory

Quantum refereed game in quantum information processing is a class of games in the general theory of quantum games. It is played between two players, Alice and Bob, and arbitrated by a referee. The referee outputs the pay-off for the players after interacting with them for a fixed number of rounds, while exchanging quantum information.

== Definition ==
An $n$-turn quantum referee performs $n$ rounds of interaction with the player Alice and Bob. Each interaction involves receiving some quantum states from Alice and Bob, processing the quantum states together with the "left-over" state from the previous interaction, producing some output state, and sending part of the output state to the players. At the end of the $n$ rounds, the referee processes the final state received from the players and decides the pay-off for Alice and Bob. The role of the referee is to pass along qubits to players Alice and Bob. It is the referee's job to entangle the qubits, which is argued to be essential in quantum games. When Alice and Bob return the qubits to the referee, the referee then checks their final states.

Quantum Refereed Games

Mathematically, an n-turn referee is a measuring co-strategy $\{R_a:a\in\Sigma\}$ whose input spaces $\mathcal X_1,\cdots, \mathcal X_n$ and output spaces $\mathcal Y_1,\cdots, \mathcal Y_n$ are of the form

$\mathcal X_k = \mathcal A_k\otimes \mathcal B_k$ and $\mathcal Y_k = \mathcal C_k\otimes\mathcal D_k$

for complex Euclidean spaces $\mathcal A_k,\mathcal B_k,\mathcal C_k$ and $\mathcal D_k,\ 1\leq k\leq n$.

$\mathcal A_k,\mathcal B_k$ represent the message sent by the referee to Alice and Bob during turn $k$, and $\mathcal C_k,\mathcal D_k$ correspond to their responses. At the end of $n$ turns, the referee produces an output $a\in\Sigma$

An $n$-turn quantum refereed game consists of an n-turn referee along with functions $V_A, V_B:\Sigma\mapsto\mathbb R$ that maps each measurement output $a$ to Alice's and Bob's pay-off.

Individual quantum refereed games may place specific restrictions on strategies Alice and Bob can choose from. For example, in nonlocal games and pseudo-telepathy games, Alice and Bob are allowed to share entanglement but are forbidden from communicating. In general, such restrictions may not apply in quantum refereed games.

A language L is considered to have a refereed game with error ε if it has a polynomial time verifier satisfying these conditions: for each string x∈L Alice (the yes prover) can convince the referee to accept x with probability of at least 1-ε regardless of Bob's strategy (the no prover) and for each string x∉L Bob can convince the referee to reject x with a probability of at least 1-ε regardless of Alice's strategy.

== Zero-sum games ==
Similar to a classical zero-sum game, a zero-sum quantum refereed game is a quantum refereed game with the additional constraint $V_A(a) + V_B(a) = 0$.

It is natural to assume Alice and Bob play independent strategies in a zero-sum quantum refereed game, since it cannot simultaneously be to both players' advantage to communicate directly with one another or to initially share an entanglement state {reference}. In this case, Alice's and Bob's strategy can be represented by

$A\in \mathcal S_n(\mathcal A_{1\cdots n}, \mathcal C_{1\cdots n})$ and $B\in \mathcal S_n(\mathcal B_{1\cdots n}, \mathcal D_{1\cdots n})$

where $\mathcal S_n(\mathcal X_{1\cdots n},\mathcal Y_{1\cdots n})$ is the set of all n-turn strategies having input space $\mathcal X_1,\cdots,\mathcal X_n$ and output space $\mathcal Y_1,\cdots, \mathcal Y_n$.

The combined strategy is then $A\otimes B$.

=== Min-max theorem ===
Define $V(a) = V_A(a) = -V_B(a)$, and $R = \sum_{a\in\Sigma} V(a) R_a$, then Alice's expected pay-off is $\sum_{a\in\Sigma}V(a)\langle A\otimes B,R_a\rangle = \langle A\otimes B,R\rangle$

The optimal strategy for Alice then lies in the min-max problem

$$\max_{A}\min_{B} \langle A\otimes B,R\rangle = \min_{B}\max_{A} \langle A\otimes B,R\rangle$$.

The above equality holds because $A, B$ are drawn from compact and convex sets $\mathcal S_n(\mathcal A_{1\cdots n}, \mathcal C_{1\cdots n})$ and $\mathcal S_n(\mathcal B_{1\cdots n}, \mathcal D_{1\cdots n})$. It is called the min-max theorem for zero-sum quantum games.

== One turn games ==
One turn quantum refereed games are a sub set of quantum refereed games (QRG) where there are two unbounded players (Alice and Bob) and a computationally bounded referee. They are called one turn games or QRG1 because there is only one turn per game. The game works by having each player send a density matrix to the referee who then plugs those states into his quantum circuit. The winner of the game is decided by the outcome of the circuit where, Alice wins the majority of times when a "yes" or |1> state is produced by the circuit and Bob wins the majority of the time when a "no" or |0> state is produced by the circuit. A turn consists of the referee sending a message to the prover (Alice or Bob) and then Alice or Bob sending a response back to the referee. The order of the game goes as follows: Alice sends the referee her density matrix, then the referee processes Alice's state and sends a state to Bob, Bob then measures the state and sends a classical result back to the referee, the referee then checks Bob's measurement and either produces a "yes" meaning Alice wins or produces a "no" and Bob wins.

== Bell state games ==
In a Bell State quantum refereed game, there are three participants, Alice, Bob, and the Referee. The game consists of three doors. Behind each door is either an x or an o (spin up state or spin down state). The referee gives Alice and Bob three conditions about what is behind each of the doors. For example, the conditions could be: 1) Doors1 and 2 have the same. 2) Doors 2 and 3 have the same. 3) Door 1 and 3 are different.

The aim of this game is for Alice and Bob to find a matching pair behind the doors. In quantum terms, this means that Alice and Bob produce matching density states. During the game, Alice and Bob are not allowed to communicate, but they are allowed to strategize before the game begins. They do this by sharing an entangled pair of photons. Strategizing allows for Alice and Bob to maximize their changes of winning. Without strategizing, Alice and Bob have a 2/3 chance of winning. By strategizing, Alice and Bob's probability of producing matching quantum states increases from 2/3 to 3/4.

== Quantum interactive proof with competing provers ==
A quantum interactive proof with two competing provers is a generalization of the single prover quantum interactive proof system. It can be modelled by zero-sum refereed games where Alice and Bob are the competing provers, and the referee is the verifier. The referee is assumed to be computationally bounded (polynomial size quantum circuit), whereas Alice and Bob can be computationally unrestricted. Alice, Bob and the referee receive a common string, and after fixed rounds of interactions (exchanging quantum information between the provers and the referee), the referee decides whether Alice wins or Bob wins.

=== Classical games ===
In the classical setting, RG can be viewed as the following problem. Alice, Bob, and the referee is given some statement. Alice is trying to convince the referee that the statement is true while Bob is trying to convince the referee that the statement is false. The referee, who has limited computing power, will look at the proofs provided by Alice and Bob, ask them questions, and at the end of the day decide which player is correct (wins). The goal is for the referee to find an algorithm such that if the statement is true, there is a way for Alice to win with probability greater than 3/4, and if the statement is false, there is a way for Bob to win with probability greater than 3/4. This probability is equal to 1-ε.

In the language of complexity theory, a promise problem $L = (L_{\text{yes}}, L_{\text{no}})$ has a classical refereed game (classical RG) if there exists a referee described by polynomial time randomized computation, such that

1. for each $x\in L_{\text{yes}}$, there is a strategy for Alice to win with probability ≥ 3/4, and

2. for each $x\in L_{\text{no}}$, there is a strategy for Bob to win with probability ≥ 3/4.

It is known that RG = EXP.

=== Quantum games ===
Quantum interactive proof systems with competing provers is a generalization of the classical RG where the referee is now restricted to polynomial-time generated quantum circuits and may exchange quantum information with the players. Therefore, QRG can be seen as the following problem. Alice, Bob and the referee is given some statement (it may involve a quantum state). Alice is trying to convince the referee the statement is true while Bob is trying to convince the referee the statement is false. The referee can ask the provers questions via quantum states, receive answers in quantum states, and analyse the received quantum states using a quantum computer. After communicating with Alice and Bob for $n$ rounds, the referee decides whether the statement is true or false. If there is a way for the referee to make a correct decision with probability ≥ 3/4, the game is in QRG. This probability is ≥ 1-ε.

More formally, QRG denotes the complexity class for all promise problems having quantum refereed games defined as follows. Given a string $x$, a promise problem $L = (L_{\text{yes}}, L_{\text{no}})$ is in QRG if there is a referee represented by a polynomial time generated quantum circuit such that

1. if $x\in L_{\text{yes}}$, there exists a strategy for Alice to win with probability ≥ 3/4, and
2. if $x\in L_{\text{no}}$, there exists a strategy for Bob to win with probability ≥ 3/4.

It turns out that QRG = EXP — allowing the referee to use quantum circuit and send or receive quantum information does not give the referee any extra power. EXP ⊆ QRG follows from the fact that EXP = RG ⊆ QRG. proved QRG ⊆ EXP by a formulation of QRG using semidefinite programs (SDP).

==== Semidefinite program formulation ====
For a quantum refereed game, at the end of all the interactions, the referee outputs one of the two possible outcomes $\{a,b\}$ to indicate whether Alice wins $(a)$ or Bob wins $(b)$.

Setting $V(a) = 1, V(b) = 0$ results in a quantum refereed game whose value is the maximum winning probability for Alice.

Using the same notation as the zero sum quantum refereed game as above, the referee is represented by operators $\{R_a,R_b\}$, Alice may pick a strategy from $A\in\mathcal S_n(\mathcal A_{1\cdots n},\mathcal C_{1\cdots n})$, and Bob from $B\in\mathcal S_n(\mathcal B_{1\cdots n},\mathcal D_{1\cdots n})$. Define

$\Omega_a(A) = \operatorname{Tr}_{\mathcal C_{1\cdots n}\otimes\mathcal A_{1\cdots n}}((A\otimes I_{\mathcal D_{1\cdots n}\otimes B_{1\cdots n}})R_a)$ , and

$$\Omega_b(A) = \operatorname{Tr}_{\mathcal C_{1\cdots n}\otimes\mathcal A_{1\cdots n}}((A\otimes I_{\mathcal D_{1\cdots n}\otimes B_{1\cdots n}})R_b)$$,

where $\operatorname{Tr}_{\mathcal X}(Z)$ is the partial trace operator.

The referee outputs $a$ with probability $\langle A\otimes B,R_a\rangle = \langle B,\Omega_a(A)\rangle$, and $b$ with probability $\langle A\otimes B,R_b\rangle = \langle B,\Omega_b(A)\rangle$. $\{\Omega_a(A),\Omega_b(A)\}$ can be considered as a co-strategy that merges Alice's strategy with the referee's.

For any given strategy $A$ Alice chooses, the maximum winning probability for Bob is

$$\max_B\langle B,\Omega_b(A)\rangle$$,

which, by the property of the strategy representation, is equal to

$$\min\{p\geq 0:\Omega_b(A)\leq p Q,\ Q\in\text{co-}\mathcal S_n(\mathcal B_{1\cdots n},\mathcal D_{1\cdots n})\}$$.

Therefore, to maximize Alice's winning probability, $p$, the maximum winning probability for Bob, needs to be minimized over all possible strategies. The goal is then to compute

$$\begin{array}{rl}
\min & p \\
\text{subject to} & \Omega_b(A)\leq pQ, \\
& A\in \mathcal S_n(\mathcal A_{1\cdots n}, \mathcal C_{1\cdots n}),\\
& Q\in\text{co-}\mathcal S_n(\mathcal B_{1\cdots n},\mathcal D_{1\cdots n})
\end{array}$$.

This minimization problem can be expressed by the following SDP problem:

$$\begin{array}{rll}
\min & \operatorname{Tr}(P_1) \\
\text{subject to} & \Omega_b(A_n)\leq Q, \\
&\operatorname{Tr}_{\mathcal C_k}(A_k) = A_{k-1}\otimes I_{\mathcal A_k} & (2\leq k\leq n),\\
&\operatorname{Tr}_{\mathcal C_1}(A_1) = I_{\mathcal A_1},\\
&Q_k = P_k\otimes I_{\mathcal D_k}&(1\leq k\leq n),\\
&\operatorname{Tr}_{\mathcal B_k}(P_k) = Q_{k-1}&(2\leq k\leq n),\\
&A_k\in\operatorname{Pos}(\mathcal C_{1\cdots k}\otimes A_{1\cdots k}) & (1\leq k\leq n),\\
&Q_k\in\operatorname{Pos}(\mathcal D_{1\cdots k}\otimes B_{1\cdots k}) & (1\leq k\leq n),\\
&P_k\in\operatorname{Pos}(\mathcal D_{1\cdots k}\otimes B_{1\cdots k}) & (1\leq k\leq n),\\
\end{array}$$.

The dimension of the input and output space of this SPD is exponential (from the tensor product states) in $n$, and the SDP has a size polynomial in the dimension of its input and output space. Since there are efficient algorithms that can solve SDP in polynomial-time, it follows that QRG ⊆ EXP.

== See also ==
- Min-max theorem
- Semidefinite programming
- QIP (complexity)
