= Free electron model =

Model of electrons within a metallic solid

In solid-state physics, the free electron model is a quantum mechanical model for the behaviour of charge carriers in a metallic solid. It was developed in 1927, principally by Arnold Sommerfeld, who combined the classical Drude model with quantum mechanical Fermi–Dirac statistics and hence it is also known as the Drude–Sommerfeld model.

Given its simplicity, it is surprisingly successful in explaining many experimental phenomena, especially

- the Wiedemann–Franz law which relates electrical conductivity and thermal conductivity;
- the temperature dependence of the electron heat capacity;
- the shape of the electronic density of states;
- the range of binding energy values;
- electrical conductivities;
- the Seebeck coefficient of the thermoelectric effect;
- thermal electron emission and field electron emission from bulk metals.

The free electron model solved many of the inconsistencies related to the Drude model and gave insight into several other properties of metals. The free electron model considers that metals are composed of a quantum electron gas where ions play almost no role. The model can be very predictive when applied to alkali and noble metals.

== History ==
=== Issues with the Drude model ===
In 1900, Paul Drude developed the Drude model of electrical conduction, which was refined by Hendrik Lorentz. Drude model was successful in predicting Wiedemann–Franz law. However physicists like Albert Einstein and Max Reinganum quickly pointed out various problems.

By 1911, it was the consensus that the Drude model provided an incorrect prediction of the heat capacity. The same year, in his dissertation Niels Bohr pointed out that Drude model could not predict the diamagnetism of metals. In the same way, Karl Baedeker pointed out that all galvanomagnetic predictions were wrong.

In 1924, the fourth Solvay Conference was organized about the problems with the Drude model. About this time, theories of degeneracy were being discussed. Einstein working with Satyendra Nath Bose, tried to apply the recently developed Bose–Einstein statistics to electrons in a metal but he showed it was not compatible. In 1925, Wolfgang Pauli proposed the exclusion principle for electrons. Enrico Fermi and Paul Dirac came independently with Fermi–Dirac statistics in 1926. Specially Fermi was motivated by the failures of the Drude model.

=== Sommerfeld's work ===
Arnold Sommerfeld became involved in the theory of metals during a meeting in University of Hamburg in the spring 1927. During the meeting, Pauli shared his work with Sommerfeld who quickly realized that the classical Maxwell–Boltzmann statistics of the Drude model could be the source of the issue. When Sommerfeld returned to the Ludwig-Maximilians-Universität München, he applied Fermi–Dirac statistics and found that the new prediction of Wiedemann–Franz law was even more accurate than the result of the Drude model.

In the summer of 1927, Sommerfeld lectured about his result and showed that the specific heat problem was solved by using the right statistics. That year, he published his results in Die Naturwissenschaften and presented his conclusions during the Como Conference. After the conference, many physicists, including Yakov Frenkel, Fermi, Georg Joos and Walter Schottky, continued to discuss the model with Sommerfeld by mail.

=== Promoting the theory ===
During winter 1927/1928 he gave a lecture to his students, including Rudolf Peierls, Carl Eckart, William V. Houston and Linus Pauling. Peierls remembers that "Sommerfeld... was going around with a little book by Karl Baedeker, which was then the reference book about the properties of metals and definitions of the various coefficients, and seeing how far things could be made to agree with the theory and how far they couldn't." Eckart remembers that later Sommerfeld got them involved for a year in working on the Drude–Lorentz model using Fermi–Dirac statistics. Sommerfeld wrote a two-part treatise on the topic in Zeitschrift für Physik in 1928. At least, 14 other articles were published that year on the topic in that journal, including equations for field electron emission developed by Lothar Wolfgang Nordheim, student of Sommerfeld and Ralph H. Fowler.

The same year, Bohr wrote to William Hume-Rothery that Sommerfeld work "meant a decisive step as regards to the adequate quantum theoretical treatment of the metallic problem." Einstein indicated that Sommerfeld's model was under his impression the "correct recovery, in principle, of what is true in the original electron theory of metals." Some were not convinced, including Lawrence Bragg.

Sommerfeld nevertheless promoted his work in a trip to Japan in 1928 and to the United States in 1931. John Bardeen, who later developed the transistor, attended Sommerfeld's lecture on the free electron model in Wisconsin. Sommerfeld also wrote a review of the model in 1931 with Nathaniel H. Frank for Reviews of Modern Physics. And included a chapter in 1933 Handbuch der Physik with Bethe.

=== Succeeding theory ===
A major breakthrough with respect to the Drude and free electron models came in 1928, with Felix Bloch dissertation, under the supervision of Werner Heisenberg. Bloch's theorem introduced the electron wave behavior and made use of the lattice periodicity. Contrary to Sommerfeld's semi-classical model, Bloch's theory was the first time that the electron was treated quantum mechanically using the recently developed quantum mechanics by Heisenberg and Erwin Schrödinger. Bethe, years later, wrote that he believed in Sommerfeld until the work of Felix Bloch appeared.

== Ideas and assumptions ==
In the free electron model four main assumptions are taken into account:

- Free electron approximation: The interaction between the ions and the valence electrons is mostly neglected, except in boundary conditions. The ions only keep the charge neutrality in the metal. Unlike in the Drude model, the ions are not necessarily the source of collisions.
- Independent electron approximation: The interactions between electrons are ignored. The electrostatic fields in metals are weak because of the screening effect.
- Relaxation-time approximation: There is some unknown scattering mechanism such that the electron probability of collision is inversely proportional to the relaxation time $\tau$, which represents the average time between collisions. The collisions do not depend on the electronic configuration.
- Pauli exclusion principle: Each quantum state of the system can only be occupied by a single electron. This restriction of available electron states is taken into account by Fermi–Dirac statistics (see also Fermi gas). Main predictions of the free-electron model are derived by the Sommerfeld expansion of the Fermi–Dirac occupancy for energies around the Fermi level.

The name of the model comes from the first two assumptions, as each electron can be treated as free particle with a respective quadratic relation between energy and momentum.

The crystal lattice is not explicitly taken into account in the free electron model, but a quantum-mechanical justification was given a year later (1928) by Bloch's theorem: an unbound electron moves in a periodic potential as a free electron in vacuum, except for the electron mass m_{e} becoming an effective mass m* which may deviate considerably from m_{e} (one can even use negative effective mass to describe conduction by electron holes). Effective masses can be derived from band structure computations that were not originally taken into account in the free electron model.

== From the Drude model ==
Many physical properties follow directly from the Drude model, as some equations do not depend on the statistical distribution of the particles. Taking the classical velocity distribution of an ideal gas or the velocity distribution of a Fermi gas only changes the results related to the speed of the electrons.

Mainly, the free electron model and the Drude model predict the same DC electrical conductivity σ for Ohm's law, that is

$\mathbf{J} = \sigma \mathbf{E}\quad$ with $\quad\sigma = \frac{ne^2\tau}{m_e},$

where $\mathbf{J}$ is the current density, $\mathbf{E}$ is the external electric field, $n$ is the electronic density (number of electrons/volume), $\tau$ is the mean free time and $e$ is the electron electric charge.

Other quantities that remain the same under the free electron model as under Drude's are the AC susceptibility, the plasma frequency, the magnetoresistance, and the Hall coefficient related to the Hall effect.

== Properties of an electron gas ==
Many properties of the free electron model follow directly from equations related to the Fermi gas, as the independent electron approximation leads to an ensemble of non-interacting electrons. For a three-dimensional electron gas we can define the Fermi energy as

$$E_{\rm F} = \frac{\hbar^2}{2m_e}\left(3\pi^2n\right)^\frac{2}{3},$$

where $\hbar$ is the reduced Planck constant. The Fermi energy defines the energy of the highest energy electron at zero temperature. For metals the Fermi energy is in the order of units of electronvolts above the free electron band minimum energy.

In three dimensions, the density of states of a gas of fermions is proportional to the square root of the kinetic energy of the particles.

=== Density of states ===
The 3D density of states (number of energy states, per energy per volume) of a non-interacting electron gas is given by:

$$g(E) = \frac{m_e}{\pi^2\hbar^3}\sqrt{2m_eE} = \frac{3}{2}\frac{n}{E_{\rm F}}\sqrt{\frac{E}{E_{\rm F}}},$$

where $E \geq 0$ is the energy of a given electron. This formula takes into account the spin degeneracy but does not consider a possible energy shift due to the bottom of the conduction band. For 2D the density of states is constant and for 1D is inversely proportional to the square root of the electron energy.

=== Fermi level ===
The chemical potential $\mu$ of electrons in a solid is also known as the Fermi level and, like the related Fermi energy, often denoted $E_{\rm F}$. The Sommerfeld expansion can be used to calculate the Fermi level ($T>0$) at higher temperatures as:

$$E_{\rm F}(T) = E_{\rm F}(T=0) \left[1 - \frac{\pi ^2}{12} \left(\frac{T}{T_{\rm F}}\right) ^2 - \frac{\pi^4}{80} \left(\frac{T}{T_{\rm F}}\right)^4 + \cdots \right],$$

where $T$ is the temperature and we define $T_{\rm F} = E_{\rm F}/k_{\rm B}$ as the Fermi temperature ($k_{\rm B}$ is Boltzmann constant). The perturbative approach is justified as the Fermi temperature is usually of about 10^{5} K for a metal, hence at room temperature or lower the Fermi energy $E_{\rm F}(T=0)$ and the chemical potential $E_{\rm F}(T>0)$ are practically equivalent.

=== Compressibility of metals and degeneracy pressure ===
The total energy per unit volume (at $T = 0$) can also be calculated by integrating over the phase space of the system, we obtain

$$u(0) = \frac{3}{5}nE_{\rm F},$$

which does not depend on temperature. Compare with the energy per electron of an ideal gas: $\frac{3}{2}k_{\rm B}T$, which is null at zero temperature. For an ideal gas to have the same energy as the electron gas, the temperatures would need to be of the order of the Fermi temperature. Thermodynamically, this energy of the electron gas corresponds to a zero-temperature pressure given by

$$P = -\left(\frac{\partial U}{\partial V}\right)_{T,\mu} = \frac{2}{3}u(0),$$

where $V$ is the volume and $U(T) = u(T) V$ is the total energy, the derivative performed at temperature and chemical potential constant. This pressure is called the electron degeneracy pressure and does not come from repulsion or motion of the electrons but from the restriction that no more than two electrons (due to the two values of spin) can occupy the same energy level. This pressure defines the compressibility or bulk modulus of the metal

$$B = -V\left(\frac{\partial P}{\partial V}\right)_{T,\mu} = \frac{5}{3}P = \frac{2}{3}nE_{\rm F}.$$

This expression gives the right order of magnitude for the bulk modulus for alkali metals and noble metals, which show that this pressure is as important as other effects inside the metal. For other metals the crystalline structure has to be taken into account.

=== Magnetic response ===
According to the Bohr–Van Leeuwen theorem, a classical system at thermodynamic equilibrium cannot have a magnetic response. The magnetic properties of matter in terms of a microscopic theory are purely quantum mechanical. For an electron gas, the total magnetic response is paramagnetic and its magnetic susceptibility given by

$$\chi=\frac{2}{3}\mu_0\mu_\mathrm{B}^2g(E_\mathrm{F}),$$

where $\mu_0$ is the vacuum permittivity and the $\mu_{\rm B}$ is the Bohr magneton. This value results from the competition of two contributions: a diamagnetic contribution (known as Landau's diamagnetism) coming from the orbital motion of the electrons in the presence of a magnetic field, and a paramagnetic contribution (Pauli's paramagnetism). The latter contribution is three times larger in absolute value than the diamagnetic contribution and comes from the electron spin, an intrinsic quantum degree of freedom that can take two discrete values and it is associated to the electron magnetic moment.

== Corrections to Drude's model ==
=== Heat capacity ===
One open problem in solid-state physics before the arrival of quantum mechanics was to understand the heat capacity of metals. While most solids had a constant volumetric heat capacity given by Dulong–Petit law of about $3nk_{\rm B}$ at large temperatures, it did correctly predict its behavior at low temperatures. In the case of metals that are good conductors, it was expected that the electrons contributed also the heat capacity.

The classical calculation using Drude's model, based on an ideal gas, provides a volumetric heat capacity given by

$$c^\text{Drude}_V = \frac{3}{2}nk_{\rm B}$$.

If this was the case, the heat capacity of a metals should be 1.5 of that obtained by the Dulong–Petit law.

Nevertheless, such a large additional contribution to the heat capacity of metals was never measured, raising suspicions about the argument above. By using Sommerfeld's expansion one can obtain corrections of the energy density at finite temperature and obtain the volumetric heat capacity of an electron gas, given by:

$$c_V=\left(\frac{\partial u}{\partial T}\right)_{n}=\frac{\pi^2}{2}\frac{T}{T_{\rm F}} nk_{\rm B}$$,

where the prefactor to $nk_B$ is considerably smaller than the 3/2 found in $c^{\text{Drude}}_V$, about 100 times smaller at room temperature and much smaller at lower $T$.

Evidently, the electronic contribution alone does not predict the Dulong–Petit law, i.e. the observation that the heat capacity of a metal is still constant at high temperatures. The free electron model can be improved in this sense by adding the contribution of the vibrations of the crystal lattice. Two famous quantum corrections include the Einstein solid model and the more refined Debye model. With the addition of the latter, the volumetric heat capacity of a metal at low temperatures can be more precisely written in the form,

$$c_V\approx\gamma T + AT^3$$,

where $\gamma$ and $A$ are constants related to the material. The linear term comes from the electronic contribution while the cubic term comes from Debye model. At high temperature this expression is no longer correct, the electronic heat capacity can be neglected, and the total heat capacity of the metal tends to a constant given by the Dulong–petit law.

=== Mean free path ===
Notice that without the relaxation time approximation, there is no reason for the electrons to deflect their motion, as there are no interactions, thus the mean free path should be infinite. The Drude model considered the mean free path of electrons to be close to the distance between ions in the material, implying the earlier conclusion that the diffusive motion of the electrons was due to collisions with the ions. The mean free paths in the free electron model are instead given by $\lambda=v_{\rm F}\tau$ (where $v_{\rm F}=\sqrt{2E_{\rm F}/m_e}$ is the Fermi speed) and are in the order of hundreds of ångströms, at least one order of magnitude larger than any possible classical calculation. The mean free path is then not a result of electron–ion collisions but instead is related to imperfections in the material, either due to defects and impurities in the metal, or due to thermal fluctuations.

=== Thermal conductivity and thermopower ===
While Drude's model predicts a similar value for the electric conductivity as the free electron model, the models predict slightly different thermal conductivities.

The thermal conductivity is given by $\kappa=c_V \tau\langle v^2\rangle/3$ for free particles, which is proportional to the heat capacity and the mean free path which depend on the model ($\langle v^2\rangle^{1/2}$ is the mean (square) speed of the electrons or the Fermi speed in the case of the free electron model). This implies that the ratio between thermal and electric conductivity is given by the Wiedemann–Franz law,

$$\frac \kappa \sigma = \frac{m_{\rm e}c_V \langle v^2 \rangle  }{3n e^2} = L T$$

where $L$ is the Lorenz number, given by (Note: Ashcroft & Mermin 1976, p. 23 and 52(Eq. 1.53 and 2.93))

$$L=\left\{\begin{matrix}\displaystyle \frac{3}{2}\left(\frac{k_{\rm B}}{e}\right)^2\;, & \text{Drude}\\
\displaystyle\frac{\pi^2}{3}\left(\frac{k_{\rm B}}{e}\right)^2\;,&\text{free electron model.}
\end{matrix}\right.$$

The free electron model is closer to the measured value of $L=2.44\times10^{-8}$ V^{2}/K^{2} while the Drude prediction is off by about half the value, which is not a large difference. The close prediction to the Lorenz number in the Drude model was a result of the classical kinetic energy of electron being about 100 smaller than the quantum version, compensating the large value of the classical heat capacity.

However, Drude's mode predicts the wrong order of magnitude for the Seebeck coefficient (thermopower), which relates the generation of a potential difference by applying a temperature gradient across a sample $\nabla V =-S \nabla T$. This coefficient can be showed to be $S=-{c_{\rm V}}/{|ne|}$, which is just proportional to the heat capacity, so the Drude model predicts a constant that is hundred times larger than the value of the free electron model. While the latter get as coefficient that is linear in temperature and provides much more accurate absolute values in the order of a few tens of μV/K at room temperature. However this models fails to predict the sign change of the thermopower in lithium and noble metals like gold and silver.

== Inaccuracies and extensions ==
The free electron model presents several inadequacies that are contradicted by experimental observation. We list some inaccuracies below:

Temperature dependence
The free electron model presents several physical quantities that have the wrong temperature dependence, or no dependence at all like the electrical conductivity. The thermal conductivity and specific heat are well predicted for alkali metals at low temperatures, but fails to predict high temperature behaviour coming from ion motion and phonon scattering.
Hall effect and magnetoresistance
The Hall coefficient has a constant value $R_{\mathrm{H}} = -1/|ne|$ in Drude's model and in the free electron model. This value is independent of temperature and the strength of the magnetic field. The Hall coefficient is actually dependent on the band structure and the difference with the model can be quite dramatic when studying elements like magnesium and aluminium that have a strong magnetic field dependence. The free electron model also predicts that the traverse magnetoresistance, the resistance in the direction of the current, does not depend on the strength of the field. In almost all the cases it does.
Directional
The conductivity of some metals can depend of the orientation of the sample with respect to the electric field. Sometimes even the electrical current is not parallel to the field. This possibility is not described because the model does not integrate the crystallinity of metals, i.e. the existence of a periodic lattice of ions.
Diversity in the conductivity
Not all materials are electrical conductors, some do not conduct electricity very well (insulators), some can conduct when impurities are added like semiconductors. Semimetals, with narrow conduction bands also exist. This diversity is not predicted by the model and can only by explained by analysing the valence and conduction bands. Additionally, electrons are not the only charge carriers in a metal, electron vacancies or holes can be seen as quasiparticles carrying positive electric charge. Conduction of holes leads to an opposite sign for the Hall and Seebeck coefficients predicted by the model.

Other inadequacies are present in the Wiedemann–Franz law at intermediate temperatures and the frequency-dependence of metals in the optical spectrum.

More exact values for the electrical conductivity and Wiedemann–Franz law can be obtained by softening the relaxation-time approximation by appealing to the Boltzmann transport equations.

The exchange interaction is totally excluded from this model and its inclusion can lead to other magnetic responses like ferromagnetism.

An immediate continuation to the free electron model can be obtained by assuming the empty lattice approximation, which forms the basis of the band structure model known as the nearly free electron model.

Adding repulsive interactions between electrons does not change very much the picture presented here. Lev Landau showed that a Fermi gas under repulsive interactions, can be seen as a gas of equivalent quasiparticles that slightly modify the properties of the metal. Landau's model is now known as the Fermi liquid theory. More exotic phenomena like superconductivity, where interactions can be attractive, require a more refined theory.

== See also ==
- Bloch's theorem
- Electronic entropy
- Tight binding
- Two-dimensional electron gas
- Bose–Einstein statistics
- Fermi surface
- White dwarf
- Jellium
