= Sommerfeld expansion =

Integral approximation method popular in condensed matter physics

A Sommerfeld expansion is an approximation method developed by Arnold Sommerfeld in 1928 for a certain class of integrals which are common in condensed matter and statistical physics. Physically, the integrals represent statistical averages using the Fermi–Dirac distribution.

When the inverse temperature $\beta$ is a large quantity, the integral can be expanded in terms of $\beta$ as

$$\int_{-\infty}^\infty \frac{H(\varepsilon)}{e^{\beta(\varepsilon - \mu)} + 1}\,\mathrm{d}\varepsilon = \int_{-\infty}^\mu H(\varepsilon)\,\mathrm{d}\varepsilon + \frac{\pi^2}{6}\left(\frac{1}{\beta}\right)^2H^\prime(\mu) + O \left(\frac{1}{\left(\beta\mu\right)^4}\right)$$

where $H^\prime(\mu)$ is used to denote the derivative of $H(\varepsilon)$ evaluated at $\varepsilon = \mu$ and where the $O(x^n)$ notation refers to limiting behavior of order $x^n$. The expansion is only valid if $H(\varepsilon)$ vanishes as $\varepsilon \rightarrow -\infty$ and goes no faster than polynomially in $\varepsilon$ as $\varepsilon \rightarrow \infty$. If the integral is from zero to infinity, then the integral in the first term of the expansion is from zero to $\mu$ and the second term is unchanged.

== Application to the free electron model ==
Integrals of this type appear frequently when calculating electronic properties, like the heat capacity, in the free electron model of solids. In these calculations the above integral expresses the expected value of the quantity $H(\varepsilon)$. For these integrals we can then identify $\beta$ as the inverse temperature and $\mu$ as the chemical potential. Therefore, the Sommerfeld expansion is valid for large $\beta$ (low temperature) systems.

== Derivation to second order in temperature ==
We seek an expansion that is second order in temperature, i.e., to $\tau^2$, where $\beta^{-1}=\tau=k_BT$ is the product of temperature and the Boltzmann constant. Begin with a change variables to $\tau x=\varepsilon -\mu$:

$$I=\int_{-\infty}^\infty \frac{H(\varepsilon)}{e^{\beta(\varepsilon - \mu)} + 1}\,\mathrm{d}\varepsilon = \tau\int_{-\infty}^\infty \frac{H(\mu+\tau x)}{e^{x} + 1}\,\mathrm{d}x \,,$$

Divide the range of integration, $I=I_1+I_2$, and rewrite $I_1$ using the change of variables $x\rightarrow-x$:

$$I= \underbrace{\tau\int_{-\infty}^0 \frac{H(\mu+\tau x)}{e^{x} + 1}\,\mathrm{d}x}_{I_1} +
\underbrace{\tau\int_{0}^\infty \frac{H(\mu+\tau x)}{e^{x} + 1}\,\mathrm{d}x}_{I_2}\,.$$
$$I_1=\tau\int_{-\infty}^0 \frac{H(\mu+\tau x)}{e^{x} + 1}\,\mathrm{d}x
=\tau\int_0^\infty \frac{H(\mu-\tau x)}{e^{-x} + 1}\,\mathrm{d}x\,$$

Next, employ an algebraic 'trick' on the denominator of $I_1$,

$$\frac{1}{e^{-x}+1} = 1-\frac{1}{e^x+1}\,,$$

to obtain:

$$I_1=\tau\int_{0}^\infty H(\mu-\tau x)\,\mathrm{d}x
-\tau\int_0^{\infty} \frac{H(\mu-\tau x)}{e^{x} + 1}\,\mathrm{d}x\,$$

Return to the original variables with $-\tau \mathrm{d}x = \mathrm{d}\varepsilon$ in the first term of $I_1$. Combine $I=I_1+I_2$ to obtain:

$$I=\int_{-\infty}^\mu H(\varepsilon)\,\mathrm{d}\varepsilon
+\tau\int_0^{\infty} \frac{H(\mu+\tau x)-H(\mu-\tau x)}{e^{x} + 1}\,\mathrm{d}x\,$$

The numerator in the second term can be expressed as an approximation to the first derivative, provided $\tau$ is sufficiently small and $H(\varepsilon)$ is sufficiently smooth:

$$\Delta H= H(\mu+\tau x)-H(\mu-\tau x) \approx 2\tau x H'(\mu)+\cdots \, ,$$

to obtain,

$$I=\int_{-\infty}^\mu H(\varepsilon)\,\mathrm{d}\varepsilon
+2\tau^2 H'(\mu)\int_0^{\infty} \frac{x\mathrm{d}x}{e^{x} + 1}\,$$

The definite integral is known to be:

$$\int_0^{\infty} \frac{x\mathrm{d}x}{e^{x} + 1}=\frac{\pi^2}{12}$$.

Hence,

$$I=\int_{-\infty}^\infty \frac{H(\varepsilon)}{e^{\beta(\varepsilon - \mu)} + 1}\,\mathrm{d}\varepsilon \approx\int_{-\infty}^\mu H(\varepsilon)\,\mathrm{d}\varepsilon
+\frac{\pi^2}{6\beta^2} H'(\mu)\,$$

== Higher order terms and a generating function ==
We can obtain higher order terms in the Sommerfeld expansion by use of a generating function for moments of the Fermi distribution. This is given by

$$\int_{-\infty}^{\infty} \frac{d\epsilon}{2\pi} e^{\tau\epsilon/2\pi} \left\{ \frac{1}{1+e^{\beta(\epsilon-\mu)}}-\theta(-\epsilon)\right\}= \frac 1{\tau}\left\{ \frac{(\frac{\tau T}{2})}{\sin(\frac{\tau T}{2})} e^{\tau\mu/2\pi}-1\right\}, \quad 0<\tau T/2\pi< 1.$$

Here $k_{\rm B} T= \beta^{-1}$ and Heaviside step function $-\theta(-\epsilon)$ subtracts the divergent zero-temperature contribution. Expanding in powers of $\tau$ gives, for example

$$\int_{-\infty}^\infty \frac{d\epsilon}{2\pi}\left\{ \frac{1}{1+e^{\beta(\epsilon-\mu)}}-\theta(-\epsilon)\right\} =\left(\frac{\mu}{2\pi}\right),$$
$$\int_{-\infty}^\infty \frac{d\epsilon}{2\pi}\left(\frac{\epsilon}{2\pi}\right)\left\{ \frac{1}{1+e^{\beta(\epsilon-\mu)}}-\theta(-\epsilon)\right\} =\frac{1}{2!}\left(\frac{\mu}{2\pi}\right)^2+\frac{T^2}{4!},$$
$$\int_{-\infty}^\infty \frac{d\epsilon}{2\pi}\frac 1{2!}\left(\frac{\epsilon}{2\pi}\right)^2\left\{ \frac{1}{1+e^{\beta(\epsilon-\mu)}}-\theta(-\epsilon)\right\} =\frac{1}{3!}\left(\frac{\mu}{2\pi}\right)^3+\left(\frac{\mu}{2\pi}\right)\frac{T^2}{4!},$$
$$\int_{-\infty}^\infty \frac{d\epsilon}{2\pi}\frac1{3!}\left(\frac{\epsilon}{2\pi}\right)^3\left\{ \frac{1}{1+e^{\beta(\epsilon-\mu)}}-\theta(-\epsilon)\right\} =\frac{1}{4!}\left(\frac{\mu}{2\pi}\right)^4+\frac{1}{2!}\left(\frac{\mu}{2\pi}\right)^2\frac{T^2}{4!}+\frac 78\frac{T^4}{6!},$$
$$\int_{-\infty}^\infty \frac{d\epsilon}{2\pi}\frac 1{4!} \left(\frac{\epsilon}{2\pi}\right)^4\left\{ \frac{1}{1+e^{\beta(\epsilon-\mu)}}-\theta(-\epsilon)\right\} =\frac{1}{5!}\left(\frac{\mu}{2\pi}\right)^5+\frac{1}{3!}\left(\frac{\mu}{2\pi}\right)^3\frac{T^2}{4!}+\left(\frac{\mu}{2\pi}\right) \frac 78\frac{T^4}{6!},$$
$$\int_{-\infty}^\infty \frac{d\epsilon}{2\pi}\frac 1{5!}\left(\frac{\epsilon}{2\pi}\right)^5\left\{ \frac{1}{1+e^{\beta(\epsilon-\mu)}}-\theta(-\epsilon)\right\}=\frac{1}{6!}\left(\frac{\mu}{2\pi}\right)^6+\frac{1}{4!}\left(\frac{\mu}{2\pi}\right)^4\frac{T^2}{4!}+\frac{1}{2!} \left(\frac{\mu}{2\pi}\right)^2 \frac 78\frac{T^4}{6!}+ \frac{31}{24} \frac{T^6}{8!}.$$

A similar generating function for the odd moments of the Bose function is

$$\int_0^\infty \frac{d\epsilon}{2\pi}\sinh(\epsilon \tau/\pi)  \frac {1}{e^{\beta\epsilon}-1}
= \frac 1{4\tau}\left\{1- \frac{\tau T}{\tan \tau T}\right\}, \quad 0< \tau T<\pi.$$
