= Nandini Trivedi =

Indian-American physicist

- Education: Cornell University; Indian Institute of Technology
- Scientific career
- Workplaces: University of Illinois at Urbana-Champaign; Stony Brook University; Argonne National Laboratory; Tata Institute of Fundamental Research; Ohio State University
- Thesis: Electronic transport in disordered films and heterostructures (1988)
- Website: Trivedi Research Group

Nandini Trivedi is an Indian-American physicist and Professor of Physics at Ohio State University. Her research is on the emergence of new states of matter arising from strong interactions between electrons in quantum materials. She was elected a Fellow of the American Association for the Advancement of Science in 2020.

== Early life and education ==
Trivedi started her scientific career at the Indian Institutes of Technology. She moved to Cornell University for her graduate studies, where she worked on transport in disordered systems and quantum size effects in thin film heterostructures. After earning her doctorate, Trivedi was a postdoctoral research fellow at the University of Illinois at Urbana–Champaign and at the State University of New York in Stony Brook.

== Research and career ==
Trivedi started her career at the Argonne National Laboratory as an assistant scientist and got promoted to scientist. She then joined the Tata Institute of Fundamental Research as a faculty in 1995. In 2004 Trivedi joined Ohio State University as a Professor in the Department of Physics. Her research explores the emergence of new phases of matter in condensed matter systems.

== Awards and honours ==
- 2010 Elected Fellow of the American Physical Society
- 2015 Simons Foundation Fellow
- 2019 Ohio State University Distinguished Scholar
- 2020 Elected Fellow of the American Association for the Advancement of Science

== Select publications ==
- Randeria, Mohit; Trivedi, Nandini; Moreo, Adriana; Scalettar, Richard T. (1992). "Pairing and spin gap in the normal state of short coherence length superconductors". Physical Review Letters. 69 (13): 2001–2004. Bibcode:1992PhRvL..69.2001R. doi:10.1103/PhysRevLett.69.2001. PMID 10046371.
- Ghosal, Amit; Randeria, Mohit; Trivedi, Nandini (1998). "Role of Spatial Amplitude Fluctuations in Highly Disordered s-Wave Super-conductors". Physical Review Letters. 81 (18): 3940–3943. arXiv:cond-mat/9806060. Bibcode:1998PhRvL..81.3940G. doi:10.1103/PhysRevLett.81.3940. S2CID 119340645.
- Huang, Lunan; McCormick, Timothy M.; Ochi, Masayuki; Zhao, Zhiying; Suzuki, Michi-To; Arita, Ryotaro; Wu, Yun; Mou, Daixiang; Cao, Huibo; Yan, Jiaqiang; Trivedi, Nandini (2016). "Spectroscopic evidence for a type II Weyl semimetallic state in MoTe 2". Nature Materials. 15 (11): 1155–1160. arXiv:1603.06482. Bibcode:2016NatMa..15.1155H. doi:10.1038/nmat4685. ISSN 1476-4660. PMID 27400386. S2CID 2762780.
