= Ashcroft and Mermin =

Introductory condensed matter physics textbook by Neil Ashcroft and N. David Mermin

Solid State Physics
- Cover of the textbook
- Editor: Dorothy Garbose Crane
- Author: Neil Ashcroft and N. David Mermin
- Illustrator: Eric G. Hieber Associates, Inc.
- Language: English
- Subject: Condensed matter physics; Solid state physics
- Genre: Non-fiction; Textbook
- Publisher: Saunders College Publishing
- Publication date: 1976
- Publication place: United States
- Pages: 833
- ISBN: 0-03-083993-9 College edition
- OCLC: 934604
- Dewey Decimal: 530.41
- LC Class: QC176.A83
- Website: www.cengage.com/c/solid-state-physics-1e-ashcroft/9780030839931/

Solid State Physics, better known by its colloquial name Ashcroft and Mermin, is an introductory condensed matter physics textbook written by Neil Ashcroft and N. David Mermin. Published in 1976 by Saunders College Publishing and designed by Scott Olelius, the book has been translated into over half a dozen languages and it and its competitor, Introduction to Solid State Physics (often shortened to Kittel), are considered the standard introductory textbooks of condensed matter physics.

== Reception ==
The book has been reviewed several times and has been recommended in many other works. In a review of another work by the MRS Bulletin in 2011, the book was said to be "the indispensable work on electronic systems for experimental condensed matter physicists", due largely to the book's "lucidity and panache". The book is also recommended in other textbooks on condensed matter physics, including The Solid State by Harold Max Rosenberg in 1979, where it is called a "detailed, higher-level, modern treatment." The textbook Solid-State Physics for Electronics by Andre Moliton states in the foreword that the book aims to prepare students to "use by him- or herself the classic works of taught solid state physics, for example, those of Kittel and Ashcroft and Mermin." Along with Kittel, the textbook Introduction to Solid State Physics and Crystalline Nanostructures by Giuseppe Iadonisi, Giovanni Cantele, and Maria Luisa Chiofalo included the book in the "Acknowledgements" section as "special mentions". It is also called one of the standard textbooks of solid state physics in the textbook Polarized Electrons In Surface Physics. In a 2003 article detailing Mermin's contributions to solid state physics, the book was said to be "an extraordinarily readable textbook of the subject, which introduced a whole generation of solid state specialists to a subtle and elegant way of doing theoretical physics." The book, along with Kittel is also used as a benchmark for other books on solid-state physics; the publisher's description for the book Advanced Solid State Physics by Philip Phillips that was supplied to the Library of Congress for its bibliography entry states: "This is a modern book in solid state physics that should be accessible to anyone who has a working level of solid state physics at the Kittel or Ashcroft/Mermin level."

=== Reviews ===
The book received several reviews, including published articles in Science, Physics Today, and Physics Bulletin in 1977. It was also reviewed in German.

=== Impressionism, Realism, and the aging of Ashcroft and Mermin ===
In July 2013, José Menéndez, a physics professor at the Arizona State University Tempe campus published an article titled "Impressionism, Realism, and the aging of Ashcroft and Mermin" in Physics Today that stated: "It is undoubtedly one of the best physics books ever written, but it is not aging well". Both Ashcroft and Mermin wrote separate responses that were published in the same issue, addressing Menéndez's concerns. In his reply, Ashcroft wrote: "Over the years many readers have remarked that the initial edition of our book should 'not be touched'; it is just right in its treatments of the fundamentals." He then went on to say that writing a sequel "encompassing the many advances in condensed-matter physics that have occurred over the past 38 years" could be an option, but pointed to the fact that the book was translated into French, German, and Portuguese in the previous ten years as evidence that others agree it should be left as is.

== Release details ==
- Ashcroft, Neil W.; Mermin, N. David (1976). Solid state physics. New York: Saunders College Publishing. ISBN 0-03-083993-9. OCLC 934604.
- Ashcroft, Neil W.; Mermin, N. David (1979). Fizika tverdogo tela (in Russian). Vol. 1. Translated by Mihajlov, Aleksandr S; Kaganov, Moisej Isaakovič; Kugel', Kliment Il'ič. Moskva: Izdatel'stvo "Mir". OCLC 313609844.
- Ashcroft, Neil W.; Mermin, N. David (1979). Fizika tverdogo tela (in Russian). Vol. 2. Translated by Mihajlov, Aleksandr S; Kaganov, Moisej Isaakovič; Kugel', Kliment Il'ič. Moskva: Izdatel'stvo "Mir". OCLC 934758977.
- Ashcroft, Neil W.; Mermin, N.David (1982). 固体の物性各論 / Kotai no bussei kakuron (in Japanese). Translated by Matsubara, Takeo; Machida, Kazushige. Kyōto: Yoshioka Shoten. ISBN 978-4-8427-0205-6. OCLC 47518375.
- Ashcroft, Neil W.; Mermin, N. David (1986). Fizyka ciała stałego (in Polish). Translated by Kowalski, Jacek Maria. Warszawa: Państ. Wydaw. Naukowe. ISBN 978-83-01-05360-4. OCLC 1150493985.
- Ashcroft, Neil W.; Mermin, N. David (2002). Physique des solides (in French). Translated by Biet, Franck; Kachkachi, Hamid. Les Ulis: EDP sciences. ISBN 978-2-86883-577-2. OCLC 470239249.
- Ashcroft, Neil W.; Mermin, N. David (2012). Physikē stereas katastasēs (in Greek). Translated by Kamaratos, Matthaios K. Athēna: Ekdosē A.G. Pneumatikos. ISBN 978-960-7258-77-9. OCLC 880484572.
- Ashcroft, Neil W.; Mermin, N. David (2011). Física do estado sólido (in Portuguese). Translated by De Oliveira, Maria Lucia Godinho. São Paulo: Cengage Learning. ISBN 978-85-221-0902-9. OCLC 817233944.
- Ashcroft, Neil W.; Mermin, N. David (2013). 固态物理学 (in Chinese). Beijing: 世界图书出版公司. ISBN 978-7-5062-6631-4. OCLC 951624419.
- Ashcroft, Neil W.; Mermin, N. David (2013). Festkörperphysik (in German). Translated by Gress, Jochen. Munich: München Oldenbourg. ISBN 978-3-486-71301-5. OCLC 829307060.
