= Neil Ashcroft =

British physicist (1938–2021)

- Born: Neil William Ashcroft; 27 November 1938; London, England, U.K.
- Died: 15 March 2021 (aged 82); Ithaca, New York, U.S.
- Education: Victoria University College (BSc); University of Cambridge (PhD)
- Known for: Ashcroft and Mermin
- Awards: Bridgman Award (2003)
- Scientific career
- Workplaces: Cornell University; University of Chicago
- Thesis: The Fermi surface and transport properties of metals (1965)
- Doctoral advisor: John Ziman
- Doctoral students: Raymond E. Goldstein; Nandini Trivedi; Ard Louis
- Website: www.lassp.cornell.edu/NWA/Pubs

Neil William Ashcroft (27 November 1938 – 15 March 2021) was a British solid-state physicist.

== Early life and education ==
Ashcroft was born in London on 27 November 1938, and migrated to New Zealand in 1947. He was educated at Hutt Valley High School, and completed his undergraduate studies at Victoria University College, earning a Bachelor of Science degree, in 1958. He received his PhD in 1964 from the University of Cambridge for research investigating the Fermi surfaces of metals.

== Career ==
Following his PhD, Ashcroft completed postdoctoral research at the University of Chicago and at Cornell University, where he became a professor in 1975. In 1990 he was named the Horace White Professor of Physics, and was elected to emeritus status in 2006.

He served as the director for the Laboratory of Atomic and Solid State Physics at Cornell University (1979–1984), the director for the Cornell Center for Materials Research (1997–2000), and as the deputy director for the High Energy Synchrotron Source (1990–1997).

Between 1986 and 1987, he served as the head of the Condensed Matter division of the American Physical Society. His textbook on solid-state physics, written with N. David Mermin, is a standard text in the field.

Ashcroft died in Ithaca, New York, on 15 March 2021.

== Awards and honours ==
In 1997, Ashcroft was elected to the U.S. National Academy of Sciences.

In 2003, he was awarded the Bridgman Award for his contributions to high-pressure physics. Since that date, he was therefore an honorary member of the AIRAPT.
