= N. David Mermin =

American physicist

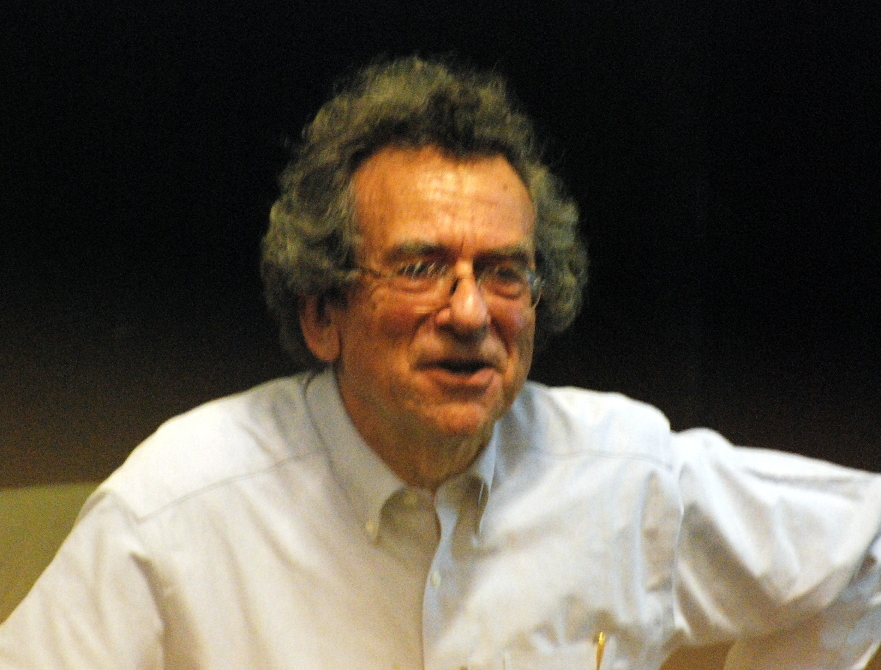
- Mermin in 2019
- Born: 30 March 1935 (age 91); New Haven, Connecticut, U.S.
- Education: Harvard University
- Known for: Ashcroft and Mermin; Hohenberg–Mermin–Wagner theorem Mermin–Ho relation Lindhard–Mermin dielectric function Coining the term 'boojum' Mermin–Peres magic square Mermin's device
- Awards: Lilienfeld Prize (1989); Klopsteg Memorial Award (1994); Majorana Prize (2010); Vision 97 Award (2017)
- Scientific career
- Fields: Physicist
- Workplaces: Cornell University; University of California, San Diego; University of Birmingham
- Doctoral students: Susan Coppersmith; Anupam Garg; Tin-Lun Ho; Daniel S. Rokhsar; Sandra Troian

Nathaniel David Mermin (/ˈmɜːrmɪn/; born 30 March 1935) is a physicist who is interested in solid-state physics and foundations of quantum mechanics. He has written over 125 technical articles as well as 3 books and many articles pitched a broad physics-literate audience. Two of his papers are featured in the 50-year retrospective of the prestigious Physical Review Letters, one on solid-state physics and one on quantum information science.

== Education and career ==
Mermin was born in 1935 in New Haven, Connecticut. He obtained a bachelor's degree in mathematics from Harvard University in 1956, graduating summa cum laude. He remained at Harvard for his graduate studies, earning a PhD in physics in 1961. After holding postdoctoral positions at the University of Birmingham and the University of California, San Diego, he joined the Cornell University faculty in 1964. He became a Cornell professor emeritus in 2006.

Early in his career, Mermin worked in statistical physics and condensed-matter physics, including the study of matter at low temperatures, the behavior of electron gases, the classification of quasicrystals, and quantum chemistry. His later research contributions included work in quantum information science and the foundations of quantum mechanics.

Mermin was the first to note how the three-particle GHZ state demonstrates that no local hidden-variable theory can explain quantum correlations, and together with Asher Peres, he introduced the "magic square" proof, another demonstration that attempting to "complete" quantum mechanics with hidden variables does not work. Richard Feynman described another paper by Mermin in this area as "one of the most beautiful papers in physics". In collaboration with Charles Bennett and Gilles Brassard, he made a significant early contribution to quantum cryptography. Starting in 2012, he has advocated the interpretation of quantum mechanics known as Quantum Bayesianism, or QBism.

== Honors ==
Mermin was elected a Fellow of the American Physical Society in 1969, and he was elected a member of the National Academy of Sciences in 1991. He was also elected a member of the American Philosophical Society in 2015.

In 2003, the journal Foundations of Physics published a tribute to Mermin in the form of three issues, 10, 11, and 12 of volume 33, dedicated to Mermin and containing articles written by his colleagues. It included a foreward by Daniel Greenberger and Abner Shimony and contained a bibliography of Mermin's writing that included three books, 125 technical articles, 18 pedagogical articles, 21 general articles, 34 book reviews, and 24 "Reference Frame" articles from Physics Today.

== Word and phrase coinages ==
Inspired by Lewis Carroll's comic poem The Hunting of the Snark, Mermin introduced the term boojum into the vocabulary of condensed-matter physics.

In his book It's About Time (2005), one of several expository pieces on special relativity, he suggests that the English foot (0.3048 meters) be slightly modified to approximately 0.2998 m. This adaptation of a physical unit is one of several ploys that Mermin uses to draw students into spacetime geometry. In the book, Mermin writes:

Henceforth, by 1 foot we shall mean the distance light travels in a nanosecond. A foot, if you will, is a light nanosecond (and a nanosecond, even more nicely, can be viewed as a light foot). ... If it offends you to redefine the foot ... then you may define 0.299792458 meters to be 1 phoot, and think "phoot" (conveniently evocative of the Greek φωτος, "light") whenever you read "foot".

Though it is often misattributed to Richard Feynman, Mermin coined the phrase "shut up and calculate!" to characterize the views of many physicists regarding the interpretation of quantum mechanics.

== Books ==
- 1968: Space and Time in Special Relativity, McGraw Hill ISBN 0-88133-420-0
- 1976: (with Neil Ashcroft) Solid State Physics, Holt, Rinehart and Winston ISBN 0-03-083993-9
- 1990: Boojums All the Way Through, Cambridge University Press ISBN 0-521-38880-5
- 2005: It's About Time: Understanding Einstein's Relativity, Princeton University Press ISBN 978-0-691-12201-4
- 2007: Quantum Computer Science, Cambridge University Press ISBN 978-0-521-87658-2
- 2016: Why Quark Rhymes with Pork: and Other Scientific Diversions, Cambridge University Press ISBN 978-1-107-02430-4
