= Timeline of condensed matter physics =

This article lists the main historical events in the history of condensed matter physics. This branch of physics focuses on understanding and studying the physical properties and transitions between phases of matter. Condensed matter refers to materials where particles (atoms, molecules, or ions) are closely packed together or under interaction, such as solids and liquids. This field explores a wide range of phenomena, including the electronic, magnetic, thermal, and mechanical properties of matter.

This timeline includes developments in subfields of condensed matter physics such as theoretical crystallography, solid-state physics, soft matter physics, mesoscopic physics, material physics, low-temperature physics, microscopic theories of magnetism in matter and optical properties of matter and metamaterials.

Even if material properties were modeled before 1900, condensed matter topics were considered as part of physics since the development of quantum mechanics and microscopic theories of matter. According to Philip W. Anderson, the term "condensed matter" appeared about 1965.

For history of fluid mechanics, see timeline of fluid and continuum mechanics.

== Before quantum mechanics ==
=== Prehistory ===
- 28,000–12,000 BP – Upper Paleolithic: earliest evidence of ceramic objects made for ritual purposes.
- 10,000–3300 BC – Neolithic: development of pottery, as well as early evidence of glass production and metalworking.
- 3300–1200 BC – Bronze Age: development of metallurgy, with copper and tin being combined to create bronze.
- 1200–300 BC – Iron Age: development of ferrous metallurgy, allowing iron and steel to largely replace bronze.

=== Antiquity ===
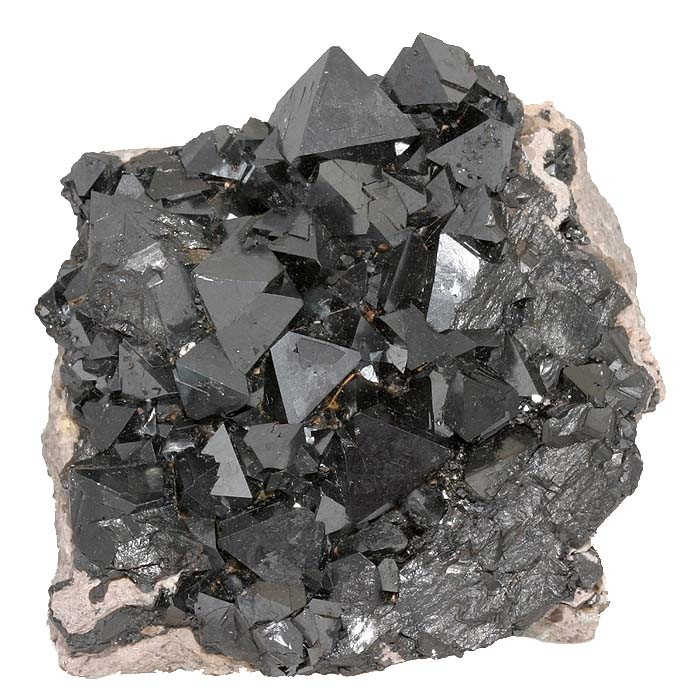
A piece of magnetite with permanent magnetic properties were noticed already in Ancient Greece

- 8th century BC: first writings on the magnetic properties of lodestone in Ancient Greece.
- 6th century BC – Thales of Miletus observes that rubbing fur on various substances, such as amber, would cause an attraction between the two, which is now known to be caused by static electricity.
- 5th century BC – Leucippus and Democritus postulate the philosophy of atomism.
- 4th century BC – Aristotle describes the composition of matter in terms of the four classical elements, founding Aristotelian physics.
- 1st century AD – Pliny the Elder in his Natural History records the story of Magnes the shepherd who discovered the magnetic properties of some iron stones.
- 160 AD – Claudius Ptolemy writes his book Optics on reflection and refraction of light, and tabulated angles of refraction for several media. He found a refraction law valid for small angles.

=== Classical theories before the 19th century ===
- 1611 – Johannes Kepler first states the Kepler conjecture about sphere packing in three-dimensional Euclidean space. It states that no arrangement of equally sized spheres filling space has a greater average density than that of the cubic close packing (face-centered cubic) and hexagonal close packing arrangements.
- 1621 – Willebrord Snellius reformulates the laws of refraction and reflection of light into Snell's law.
- 1660 – Robert Hooke postulates the simplest equation of linear elasticity known as Hooke's law.
- 1687 – Isaac Newton postulates the Newton's laws of motion.
- 1701 – Newton studies heat, leading to Newton's law of cooling.
- 1729 – Scientist Stephen Gray discovers the electrical conduction of metals.
- 1778 – Diamagnetism was first discovered when Anton Brugmans observed in 1778 that bismuth was repelled by magnetic fields.
- 1781 – René Just Haüy (often termed the "Father of Modern Crystallography") discovers that crystals always cleave along crystallographic planes. Based on this observation, and the fact that the inter-facial angles in each crystal species always have the same value, Haüy concluded that crystals must be periodic and composed of regularly arranged rows of tiny polyhedra (molécules intégrantes). This theory explained why all crystal planes are related by small rational numbers (the law of rational indices).

=== 19th century ===
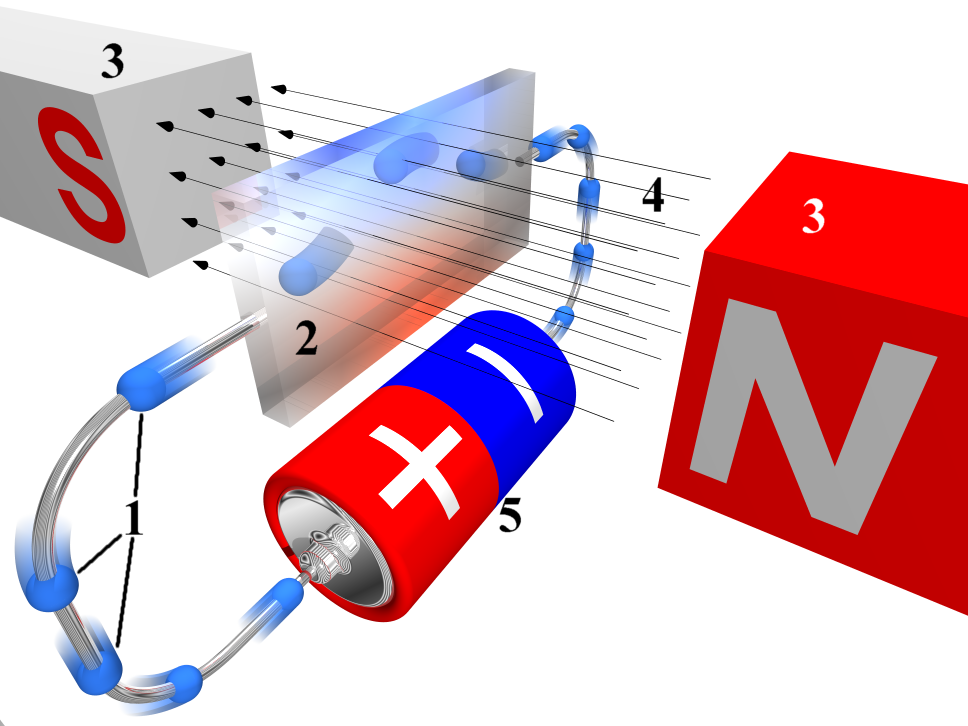
Schema of the classical Hall effect discovered in 1879, where a voltage is created perpendicular to the current in a circuit due to the influence of a magnetic field.

- 1800 – The Voltaic pile, the first electric battery is developed by Alessandro Volta.
- 1803–1808 – John Dalton reconsiders the atomic theory of matter in order to understand chemistry.
- 1816 – David Brewster discovers stress birefringence in diamond.
- 1819 – Experimentally Pierre Louis Dulong and Alexis Thérèse Petit find that the specific heat capacity of solids was close to a constant value given by Dulong–Petit law.
- 1821 – Thomas Johann Seebeck discovers the thermoelectric effect, related by the Seebeck coefficient.
- 1822 – Joseph Fourier proposes Fourier's law of thermal conduction and the heat equation.
- 1826 – Moritz Ludwig Frankenheim derives the 32 crystal classes by using the crystallographic restriction, consistent with Haüy's laws, that only 2, 3, 4 and 6-fold rotational axes are permitted.
- 1827 – Georg Ohm, publishes the proportional relation between electric current and voltage in metals, known as Ohm's law.
- 1834 – Jean-Charles Peltier discovers the Peltier effect: heating by an electric current at the junction of two different metals.
- 1839 – William Hallowes Miller invents zonal relations by projecting the faces of a crystal upon the surface of a circumscribed sphere. Miller indices are defined which form a notation system in crystallography for planes in crystal (Bravais) lattices.
- 1840 – James Prescott Joule formulates the equation for Joule heating quantifying the amount of heat produced in a circuit as proportional to the product of the time duration, the resistance, and the square of the current passing through it.
- 1845 – Michael Faraday studies the interaction of light and magnetic fields with matter (Faraday rotation).
- 1848 – Louis Pasteur discovers that sodium ammonium tartrate can crystallize in left- and right-handed forms and showed that the two forms can rotate polarized light in opposite directions. This was the first demonstration of molecular chirality, and also the first explanation of isomerism.
- 1850 – Auguste Bravais develops the concept of Bravais lattices to describe periodicity in crystals. He derives the 14 space lattices.
- 1853 – Discovery of Wiedemann–Franz law relating thermal and electrical conductivities, by Gustav Wiedemann and Rudolph Franz.
- 1854 – Lord Kelvin discovers the thermoelectric Thomson effect.
- 1859 – Gustav Kirchhoff introduces the concept of a blackbody and proves that its emission spectrum depends only on its temperature.
- 1861–1865 – James Clerk Maxwell summarizes the fundamental equations of electromagnetism into an early version of Maxwell's equations and relates electromagnetism to light in his publications On Physical Lines of Force and A Dynamical Theory of the Electromagnetic Field.
- 1867 – Dmitry Chernov establishes the critical temperatures of steel.
- 1872 – The Boltzmann transport equation, describing the statistical behaviour of a thermodynamic system not in a state of equilibrium, is devised by Ludwig Boltzmann.
- 1872 – Ludvig Lorenz finds the Lorenz number, the constant of the Wiedemann–Franz law.
- 1874 – Karl Ferdinand Braun discovered current rectification using a point-contact metal–semiconductor junction.
- 1875 – John Kerr discovers the double refraction of solid and liquids, now known as the Kerr effect.
- 1876 – Josiah Willard Gibbs introduces the concept of phase transition.
- 1879 – Edwin Hall discovers the Hall effect.
- 1879 – Leonhard Sohncke lists the 65 crystallographic point systems using rotations and reflections in addition to translations.
- 1880 – The first demonstration of the direct piezoelectric effect by the brothers Pierre Curie and Jacques Curie.
- 1883 – Thomas Edison discovers thermionic emission or the Edison effect.
- 1887 – Floris Osmond names the phases of steel.
- 1887 – Heinrich Hertz discovers the photoelectric effect.
- 1888–1889 – Crystalline optical properties of liquid crystals and their ability to flow are first described by Friedrich Reinitzer and confirmed by Otto Lehmann.
- 1891 – Derivation of the 230 space groups (by adding mirror-image symmetry to Sohncke's work) by a collaborative effort of Evgraf Fedorov and Arthur Schoenflies.
- 1895 – Wilhelm Conrad Röntgen discovers X-rays in experiments with electron beams in plasma.
- 1895 – Hendrik Lorentz derives the Lorentz force for charged particles in electric and magnetic fields.
- 1895 – Pierre Curie discovers empirically that the magnetic susceptibility of many materials is inversely proportional to temperature according to Curie's law. He also found that permanent magnetism was lost after a certain Curie temperature.
- 1896–1897 – Pieter Zeeman first observes the Zeeman splitting effect by applying a magnetic field to light sources.
- 1897 – J. J. Thomson's experimentation with cathode rays led him to suggest a fundamental unit more than a 1000 times smaller than an atom, based on the high charge-to-mass ratio. He called the particle a "corpuscle", but later scientists preferred the term electron.

== 20th century ==
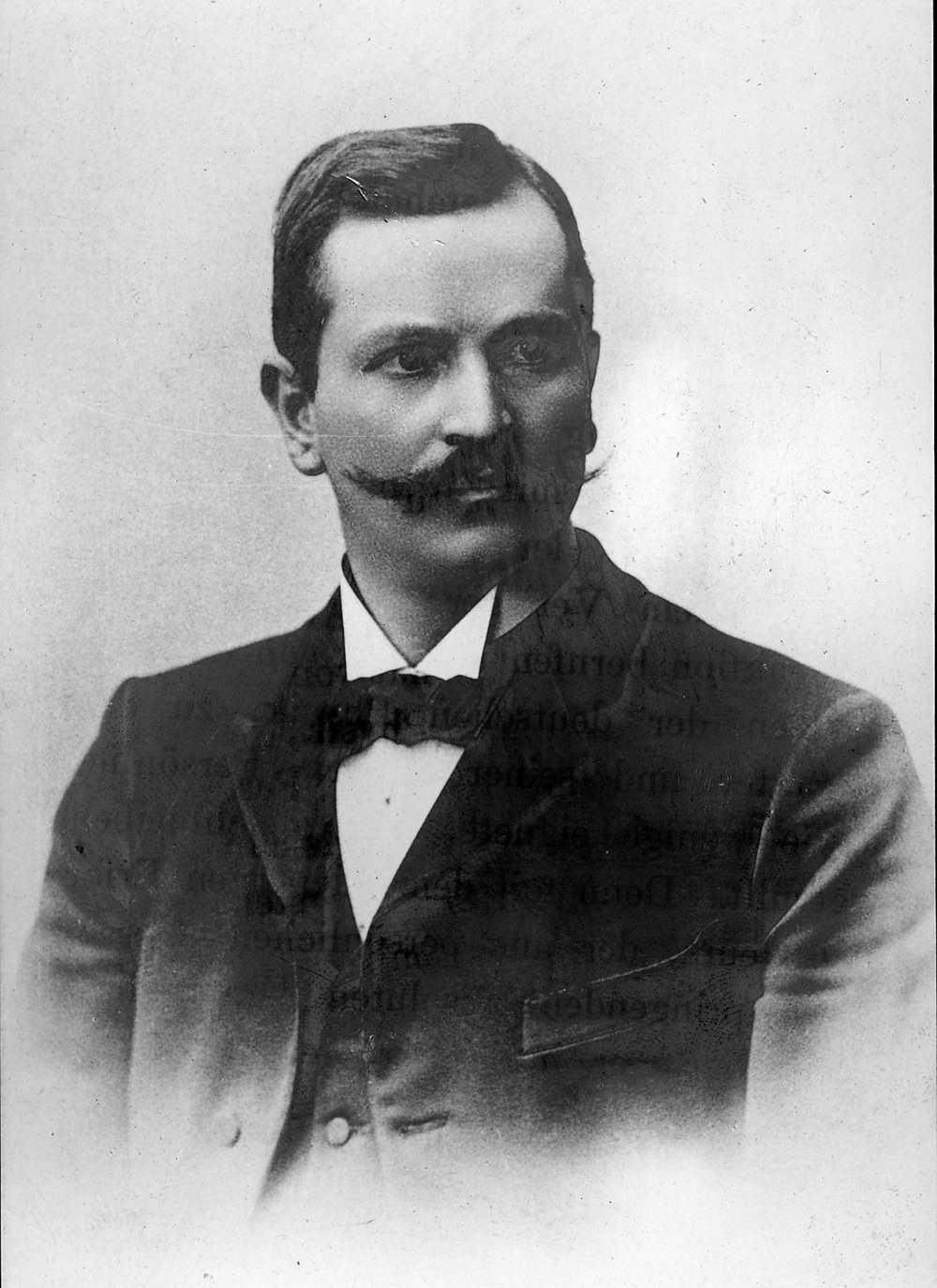
Paul Drude, author of the Drude model in 1900. He understood that thermal properties of metals could be understood as a gas of free electrons.

=== Early 1900s ===
- 1900 – Max Planck uses for the first time quantum theory to explain black-body radiation.
- 1900 – Paul Drude proposes the Drude model to explain thermal and electric properties of metals.
- 1901 – Thermionic emission is first theoretically modeled by Owen Willans Richardson
- 1905 – Albert Einstein's Annus mirabilis papers postulating special relativity, the theory for Brownian motion and explaining the photoelectric effect using quantum mechanics.
- 1905 – Paul Langevin derives the classical theory for diamagnetism.
- 1907:
  - Einstein solid model predicts the deviations for the specific heat of solids from Dulong–Petit law.
  - The first theory describing crystallographic defects is developed by Vito Volterra.
  - Pierre Weiss introduces the magnetic domain theory of ferromagnetism.
- 1909 – Lorentz develops the classical Lorentz oscillator model to describe the optical response of materials.
- 1911:
  - Heike Kamerlingh Onnes and Gilles Holst discover superconductivity in mercury.
  - The electron hole concept is pioneered by Karl Baedeker to understand semiconductors.
- 1912:
  - Max von Laue discovers diffraction of X-rays by crystals.
  - Peter Debye develops a model for the specific heat of solids in terms of phonons, known as Debye model.
  - Geertruida Lorentz, applies Einstein's Brownian motion equations to noise in electrical circuits.
- 1913 – William Henry Bragg and Lawrence Bragg use X-rays to analyze crystals.
- 1917 – Weiss and Auguste Piccard first observe the magnetocaloric effect.
- 1919 – Walter H. Schottky introduces the concept of shot noise while studying vacuum tubes.
- 1919 – Hendrika Johanna van Leeuwen rediscovers the Bohr–Van Leeuwen theorem, showing that magnetic properties of matter are due to quantum mechanics.
- 1920:
  - Ferroelectricity gets discovered in Rochelle salt by Joseph Valasek.
  - Hermann Staudinger, suggest that small molecules can be link together through covalent bonds to form polymer.
  - Wilhelm Lenz describes for the first time the Ising model as a model for magnetism in matter.
- 1923 – Pierre Auger discovers the Auger effect, where filling the inner-shell vacancy of an atom is accompanied by the emission of an electron from the same atom.
- 1923 – Louis de Broglie extends wave–particle duality to particles, postulating that electrons in motion are associated with waves. He predicts that the wavelengths are given by the Planck constant h divided by the momentum of the mv = p of the electron: λ = h / mv = h / p.
- 1923–1927 Electron wave diffraction is demonstrated experimentally independently by Davisson–Germer experiments and the experiments by George Paget Thomson and Alexander Reid.
- 1924 – Satyendra Nath Bose explains Planck's law using a new statistical law that governs bosons, and Einstein generalizes it to predict Bose–Einstein condensate. The theory becomes known as Bose–Einstein statistics.
- 1924 – Wolfgang Pauli outlines the Pauli exclusion principle which states that no two identical fermions may occupy the same quantum state simultaneously, a fact that explains many features of the periodic table.
- 1925 – Werner Heisenberg, Max Born, and Pascual Jordan develop the matrix mechanics formulation of quantum mechanics.
- 1925 – Ernst Ising finds the analytical solution to the 1D Ising model.
- 1926:
  - Enrico Fermi discovers the spin-statistics theorem connection.
  - Paul Dirac introduces Fermi–Dirac statistics.
  - Erwin Schrödinger uses de Broglie's electron wave postulate (1924) to develop a Schrödinger equation; also introduces the Hamiltonian operator in quantum mechanics.
  - Johnson–Nyquist noise is first measured by John B. Johnson at Bell Labs. He described his findings to Harry Nyquist, also at Bell Labs, who was able to explain the results.
- 1927:
  - Max Born and J. Robert Oppenheimer introduce the Born–Oppenheimer approximation, which allows the quick approximation of the energy and wavefunctions of smaller molecules.
  - Pauli models the paramagnetic contribution of itinerant electrons due to spins (Pauli paramagnetism).
  - Walter Heitler and Fritz London introduce the concepts of valence bond theory and apply it to the hydrogen molecule.
  - Llewellyn Thomas and Fermi develop the Thomas–Fermi model for a gas in a box.
  - Chandrasekhara Venkata Raman studies optical photon scattering by electrons, now known as Raman spectroscopy.
  - Walter Heitler uses Schrödinger's wave equation to show how two hydrogen atom wavefunctions join, with plus, minus, and exchange terms, to form a covalent bond.
  - Robert S. Mulliken works, in coordination with Hund, to develop a molecular orbital theory where electrons are assigned to states that extend over an entire molecule and, in 1932, introduces many new molecular orbital terminologies, such as σ bond, π bond, and δ bond.
  - Eugene Wigner relates degeneracies of quantum states to irreducible representations of symmetry groups.
  - Arnold Sommerfeld, extends Drude's model using Fermi–Dirac statistics leading to the free electron model.
  - Douglas Hartree introduced the Hartree equation for atoms.
- 1928–1930 – John Hasbrouck Van Vleck formalizes the quantum theory of magnetism and formulates Van Vleck paramagnetism.
- 1928 – Linus Pauling outlines the quantum nature of the chemical bonds.
- 1928 – Friedrich Hund and Robert S. Mulliken introduce the concept of molecular orbitals.
- 1929:
  - Felix Bloch demonstrates Bloch's theorem.
  - John Lennard-Jones introduces the linear combination of atomic orbitals (LCAO) approximation for the calculation of molecular orbitals.
  - Peierls coins the term Umklapp scattering.
  - First observation of plasma oscillations by Irving Langmuir and Lewi Tonks.
  - Egil Hylleraas finds an approximate solution to the helium atom.
- 1930:
  - Léon Brillouin develops the concept of Brillouin zone.
  - Bloch introduces the theory of spin waves and magnons,
  - Erich Hückel introduces the Hückel molecular orbital method, which expands on orbital theory to determine the energies of orbitals of pi electrons in conjugated hydrocarbon systems.
  - Fritz London explains van der Waals forces as due to the interacting fluctuating dipole moments between molecules.
  - Landau formulates the concept of Landau quantization, explaining the diamagnetic contribution of a free electron gas (Landau diamagnetism) and predicting the De Haas–Van Alphen effect. This effect was measured a few months after by Wander Johannes de Haas and his student Pieter M. van Alphen.
- 1931:
  - Onsager reciprocal relations are first proposed by Lars Onsager
  - Ralph Kronig and William Penney solve the infinite periodic array of rectangular potential barriers (Kronig–Penney model).
  - Alan Herries Wilson develops the theory of electronic band structure to describe the conduction properties of solids. He also distinguished between intrinsic and extrinsic semiconductors.
  - The concept of excitons is proposed by Yakov Frenkel.
  - John Lennard-Jones proposes the Lennard-Jones interatomic potential.
  - Ernst Ruska creates the first electron microscope.
- 1932 – Werner Heisenberg applies perturbation theory to the two-electron problem to show how resonance arising from electron exchange can explain exchange forces.
- 1933:
  - Walther Meissner and Robert Ochsenfeld discover the Meissner effect by measuring the magnetic field distribution outside superconducting tin and lead samples.
  - Landau models antiferromagnetism for the first time.
  - Landau introduces the concept of electron-phonon quasiparticle, termed polaron.
  - Erich Mollwo, working with Robert Wichard Pohl concludes that color in alkali metal halides is due to the existence of F-centers (color centers).
- 1935:
  - J.N. Rjabinin and Lev Shubnikov experimentally discover type-II superconductivity.
  - The London equations get developed by brothers Fritz and Heinz London.
  - Hartree introduces Hartree–Fock method.
- 1937:
  - Landau introduces Landau theory of phase transitions.
  - Jan Hendrik de Boer and Evert Verwey, and independently Peierls, and Nevill Francis Mott introduce the problem of the metal–insulator transition. Other developments include the discovery of the Verwey transition and the theory of the Mott insulator.
  - Wannier functions are introduced by Gregory Wannier.
  - Conyers Herring theorizes the possibility of Weyl semimetals.
- 1938 – Superfluidity is discovered by the team of Pyotr Kapitsa.
- 1941 – Landau introduces the concept of second sound.
- 1944 – Lars Onsager find an analytical solution for the 2D Ising model.
- 1947 – The first transistor is developed by William Shockley, John Bardeen and Walter Houser Brattain.
- 1947 – The theory of single layer graphite (graphene) is first published by P. R. Wallace.
- 1948 – Louis Néel discovers ferrimagnetism
- 1945–1946 – First neutron diffraction experiments are carried out by Ernest O. Wollan and independently by Clifford Shull.
- 1947–1948 – Hendrik Casimir and Dirk Polder at Philips Research Labs propose the existence of Casimir–Polder effect between two polarizable atoms and between such an atom and a conducting plate. After a conversation with Niels Bohr, who suggested it had something to do with zero-point energy.
- 1947–1948 – The formal development of quantum field theory by Richard Feynman, Julian Schwinger, Shin'ichirō Tomonaga and Freeman Dyson.
- 1949 – Werner Ehrenberg and Raymond E. Siday first predict Aharonov–Bohm effect.

=== Second half of the 20th century ===
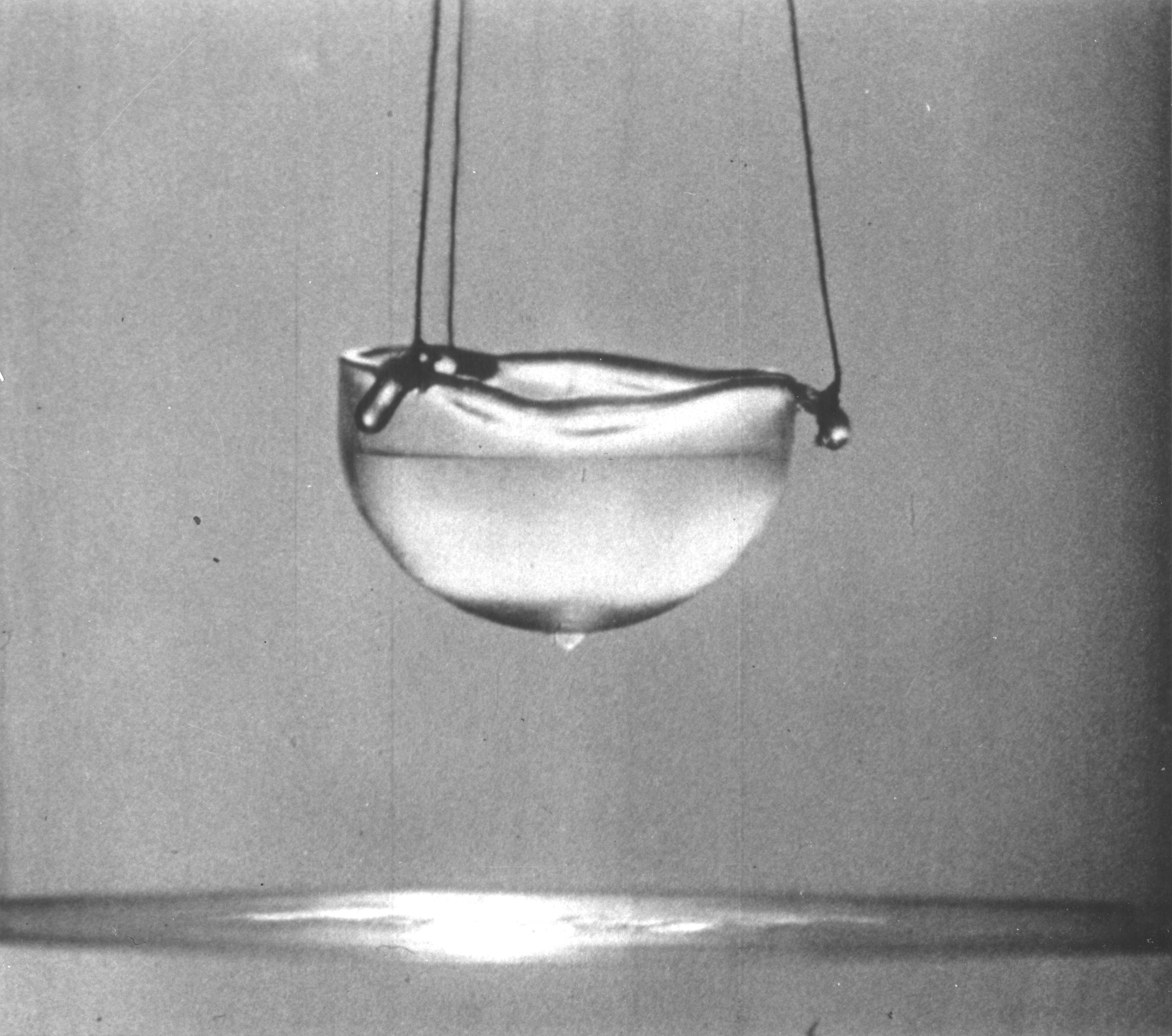
The liquid helium is in the superfluid phase. Discovered by Pyotr Kapitsa in 1938. First theoretically model with Ginzburg–Landau theory in 1950.

- 1950 – The Ginzburg–Landau theory phenomenological theory of superconductors is formulated by Vitaly Ginzburg and Landau.
- 1950 – Tomonaga introduces the Luttinger liquid model for electrons in 1D.
- 1952 – The plasmon (quantum of plasma oscillation in metals) is proposed by David Pines and David Bohm.
- 1952 – Friedel oscillations are first described by Jacques Friedel.
- 1953 – The occurrence of Van Hove singularities is first analyzed by Léon Van Hove for the case of phonon densities of states.
- 1953 – Charles H. Townes, James P. Gordon, and Herbert Zeiger demonstrate the first maser.
- 1954:
  - Lindhard theory for electric-field screening is published by Jens Lindhard.
  - The tight-binding method is conceived by John Clarke Slater and George Fred Koster.
  - Bernd T. Matthias comes up with the empirical Matthias rules for finding superconductors.
  - Herbert Fröhlich introduces the Frölich Hamiltonian for polarons.
  - Publication of Dynamical Theory of Crystal Lattices by Max Born and Huang Kun, introducing Born–Huang approximation and Cauchy–Born rule.
- 1954–1957 – Malvin Ruderman and Charles Kittel develop the theory of indirect exchange interaction, later expanded by Tadao Kasuya and Kei Yosida into the RKKY theory.
- 1955 – Dresselhaus spin–orbit coupling is discovered by Gene Dresselhaus.
- 1955 – Takeo Matsubara introduces his many-body Green's function based on Matsubara frequency formalism.
- 1956 – Theory of interacting electrons in solids, Fermi liquid theory is developed by Landau
- 1957:
  - BCS theory by Bardeen, Leon Cooper and John Robert Schrieffer.
  - Rolf Landauer, who first suggested a version the Landauer formula.
  - Ryogo Kubo who first presents the Kubo formula, to express the linear response of an observable quantity due to a time-dependent perturbation using quantum mechanics.
  - Jack Kilby proposes the first integrated circuit.
- 1957–1959 – Kubo, Paul C. Martin and Schwinger introduced the KMS condition used it in 1959 to define thermodynamic Green's functions.
- 1958:
  - Daniel C. Mattis and John Bardeen develop Mattis–Bardeen theory for the electromagnetic response of superconductors.
  - Philip W. Anderson starts developing the theory of metal-insulator transitions and Anderson localization.
  - John Hopfield coins the polariton in theory of Hopfield dielectric.
  - John Clarke, Michel Devoret and John M. Martinis demonstrate macroscopic quantum tunneling and energy quantization in a Josephson junction.
- 1958–1960 – The first laser is built by Theodore Maiman at Hughes Aircraft Company, based on a patent from Townes and Arthur Leonard Schawlow.
- 1959 – Rashba spin-orbit coupling is discovered by Emmanuel Rashba and Valentin I. Sheka.
- 1961–1964 – Schwinger, O. V. Konstantinov and Vladimir I. Perel, Leo Kadanoff and Gordon Baym, and Leonid Keldysh independently develop Keldysh formalism.
- 1962:
  - Jeffrey Goldstone, Yoichiro Nambu, Abdus Salam, and Steven Weinberg develop what is now known as Goldstone's Theorem: if there is a continuous symmetry transformation under which the Lagrangian is invariant, then either the vacuum state is also invariant under the transformation, or there must be spinless particles of zero mass, thereafter called Nambu-Goldstone bosons.
  - Philip W. Anderson proposes a spontaneous symmetry breaking mechanism (later called Higgs mechanism) for superconductors.
  - Josephson effect of electron tunneling in superconductors is predicted by Brian Josephson.
  - The Little–Parks effect is discovered by William A. Little and Ronald D. Parks.
- 1963 – John Hubbard, Martin Gutzwiller and Junjiro Kanamori each independently propose the Hubbard model.
- 1964 – Jun Kondō models the resistance minimum in metals leading to the Kondo model and the prediction of the Kondo effect. The development of the density functional theory starts with the theorems of Walter Kohn and Pierre Hohenberg.
- 1966–1967: Mermin–Wagner theorem is proved by N. David Mermin, Herbert Wagner and independently by Pierre Hohenberg.
- 1966–1968 – Zhores Alferov and independently Herbert Kroemer created the first lasers based on heterostructures.
- 1967 – Volker Heine coins the term ''condensed matter''.
- 1967 – Negative-index materials are first described theoretically by Victor Veselago.
- 1970 – French scientist Madeleine Veyssié, coins the term soft matter (French: matière molle).
- 1971:
  - The spin Hall effect is predicted by Mikhail I. Dyakonov and Vladimir I. Perel.
  - Pierre-Gilles de Gennes introduces the reptation model for polymer physics.
  - Polder and Michael Van Hove derive the theory for near-field radiative heat transfer between arbitrary non-magnetic media.
- 1971–75 – Michael Fisher, Kenneth G. Wilson, and Leo Kadanoff come up with the renormalization group.
- 1972 – David Lee, Douglas Osheroff and Robert Coleman Richardson discovered two phase transitions of helium-3 along the melting curve, which were soon realized to be the two superfluid phases.
- 1972 – The concept of Berezinskii–Kosterlitz–Thouless phase transition in the XY model is developed by Vadim Berezinskii, J. Michael Kosterlitz and David J. Thouless.
- 1973 – Peter Mansfield formulates the physical theory of nuclear magnetic resonance imaging (NMRI)
- 1979:
  - Giorgio Parisi finds a solution to Sherrington–Kirkpatrick model for spin glasses.
  - Su–Schrieffer–Heeger model is devised by Wu-Pei Su, John Robert Schrieffer, and Alan J. Heeger to describe the increase of electrical conductivity of polyacetylene polymer chain when doped.
  - Alexey Ekimov creates the first quantum dots and their quantum size effects.
- 1980 – The integer quantum Hall effect is discovered by Klaus von Klitzing
- 1980 – Richard Feynman proposes quantum computing.
- 1981 – The scanning tunneling microscope (STM), an instrument for imaging surfaces at the atomic level, was developed by Gerd Binnig and Heinrich Rohrer.
- 1982 – The fractional quantum Hall effect is discovered by Robert Laughlin, Horst Störmer, and Daniel Tsui.
- 1982 – First observation of a quasicrystal by Dan Shechtman.
- 1982 – Frank Wilczek explores the fractional statistics of quasiparticles in two dimensions and coins the term "anyon".
- 1985 – Fullerene C^{60} discovered by Richard Smalley, Robert Curl, and Harry Kroto.
- 1985 – Patrick A. Lee and A. Douglas Stone coin the term universal conductance fluctuations.
- 1986 – Binnig, Calvin Quate and Christoph Gerber invent the first atomic force microscope (AFM).
- 1986 – Discovery of high-temperature superconductivity by K. Alex Müller and Georg Bednorz.
- 1987 – Karl Alexander Müller and Georg Bednorz discover high-temperature superconductivity in ceramics.
- 1988 – Giant magnetoresistance is discovered by Albert Fert and Peter Grünberg.
- 1988 – The conductance quantum are first demonstrated in quantum point contacts.
- 1989 – Jainendra K. Jain proposes the concept of composite fermions.
- 1991 – Carbon nanotubes are discovered by Sumio Iijima
- 1995 – Experimental Bose–Einstein condensate is first demonstrated by Eric Cornell, Carl Wieman and Wolfgang Ketterle.
- 1997 – Experiment discovery of rare-earth oxides that behave as spin ice by Steven T. Bramwell, Mark Harris and collaborators, who also coined the term.
- 1998 – Thomas Callister Hales proves Kepler's conjecture.
- 1998 – Lene Hau produces slow light with a speed of 17 m/s.

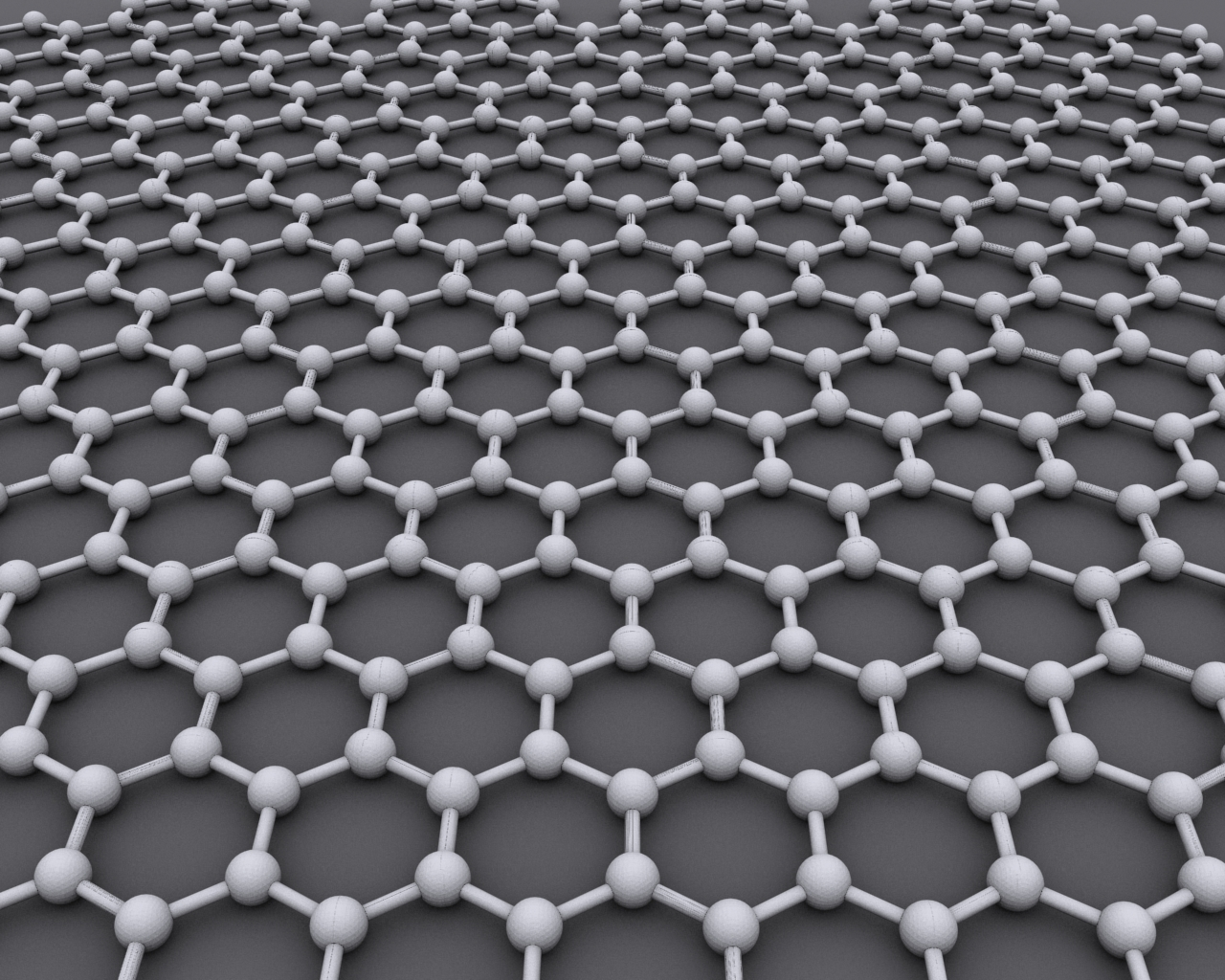
Graphene: a single atomic layer of graphite first produced in 2004.

== 21st century ==
- 2000 – The thermal conductance quantum is first measured.
- 2000 Alexei Kitaev introduces the theory of the Kitaev chain.
- 2001 – Attosecond pulsed sources are developed independently by Pierre Agostini and Ferenc Krausz, leading to the development of attosecond physics.
- 2003 – Deborah S. Jin and her collaboration produce the first fermionic condensate.
- 2004 – Single-layer graphene was first unambiguously produced and identified by the group of Andre Geim and Konstantin Novoselov.
- 2005 – Charles Kane and Gene Mele propose the quantum spin Hall effect.
- 2008-2010 – Andreas P. Schnyder, Shinsei Ryu, Akira Furusaki and Andreas W. W. Ludwig; and well as Alexei Kitaev, develop the periodic table of topological matter.
- 2013 – The quantum anomalous Hall effect is first observed by the team of Xue Qikun.
- 2012 – Wilczek proposes the idea of time crystals.
- 2015 – M. Zahid Hasan's team demonstrates the existence of Weyl semimetals.
- 2018 – Twisted graphene superconductivity is demonstrated by Pablo Jarillo-Herrero.
- 2020 – Gwendal Fève's group at École normale supérieure (Paris), and independetly Michael Manfra's group at Purdue University show first experimental evidence of anyons.
- 2024 – Altermagnetism is discovered in experiment.

== See also ==
- History of metamaterials
- Physical crystallography before X-rays
- Timeline of crystallography
- Timeline of materials technology
- Timeline of states of matter and phase transitions
- Timeline of quantum computing and communication
