= Rytov =

Rytov (Russian: Рытов) or Rõtov (Estonian transliteration) is a Slavic masculine surname, its feminine counterpart is Rytova or Rõtova. It may refer to:

- Boris Rõtov (1937–1987), Estonian chess player
- Galina Rytova (born 1975), Russian-Kazakhstani water polo player
- Merike Rõtova (born 1936), Estonian chess player, wife of Boris
- Mikhail Rytov (born 1984), Russian football player
- Sergei Mikhailovich Rytov (1908–1996), Soviet physicist, credited for
  - Rytov number
  - Rytov transformation
