= Polder tensor =

Tensor describing the magnetic permeability of ferrites

The Polder tensor is a tensor introduced by Dirk Polder in 1949 for the description of magnetic permeability of ferrites. The tensor notation needs to be used because ferrimagnetic material becomes anisotropic in the presence of a magnetizing field.

The tensor is described mathematically as:

$$B = \begin{bmatrix} \mu & j \kappa & 0 \\ -j \kappa & \mu & 0 \\ 0 & 0 & \mu_0 \end{bmatrix} H$$

Neglecting the effects of damping, the components of the tensor are given by

$$\mu = \mu_0 \left( 1+ \frac{\omega_0 \omega_m}{\omega_0^2 - \omega^2} \right)$$
$$\kappa = \mu_0 \frac{\omega \omega_m}{{\omega_0}^2 - \omega^2}$$

where

$$\omega_0 = \gamma \mu_0 H_0 \$$
$$\omega_m = \gamma \mu_0 M \$$
$$\omega = 2 \pi f$$

$\gamma = 1.11 \times 10^5 \cdot g \,\,$ (rad /s) /(A/m) is the effective gyromagnetic ratio and $g$, the so-called effective g-factor, is a ferrite material constant typically in the range of 1.5 - 2.6, depending on the particular ferrite material. $f$ is the frequency of the RF/microwave signal propagating through the ferrite, $H_0$ is the internal magnetic bias field, $M$ is the magnetization of the ferrite material and $\mu_0$ is the magnetic permeability of free space.

To simplify computations, the radian frequencies of $\omega_0, \, \omega_m, \,$ and $\omega$ can be replaced with frequencies (Hz) in the equations for $\mu$ and $\kappa$ because the $2 \pi$ factor cancels. In this case, $\gamma = 1.76 \times 10^4 \cdot g \,\,$ Hz/ (A/m) $= 1.40 \cdot g \,\,$ MHz/Oe. If CGS units are used, computations can be further simplified because the $\mu_0$ factor can be dropped.
