= Cauchy–Born rule =

Relation in crystallography

The Cauchy–Born rule or Cauchy–Born approximation is a basic hypothesis used in the mathematical formulation of solid mechanics which relates the movement of atoms in a crystal to the overall deformation of the bulk solid. A widespread simplified version states that in a crystalline solid subject to a small strain, the positions of the atoms within the crystal lattice follow the overall strain of the medium.

The rule first appears in Max Born and Huang Kun's Dynamical Theory of Crystal Lattices, a refinement of Augustin-Louis Cauchy's relations which were used to derive the equations satisfied by the Cauchy stress tensor.

== Description ==
To give a more precise definition, consider a crystalline body where the position of the atoms can be described by a set of reference lattice vectors $\mathbf{e}^0$. The Cauchy–Born rules states that if the body is deformed by a deformation whose gradient is $\mathbf{F}$, the lattice of the deform body can be described by
$$\mathbf{e} = \mathbf{F} \mathbf{e}^0\,.$$
The rule only describes the lattice, not the atoms.

The approximation generally holds for face-centered and body-centered cubic crystal systems. For complex lattices such as diamond, however, the rule has to be modified to allow for internal degrees of freedom between the sublattices. The approximation can then be used to obtain bulk properties of crystalline materials such as stress–strain relationship.

== Extensions ==
For crystalline bodies of finite size, the effect of surface stress is also significant. However, the standard Cauchy–Born rule cannot deduce the surface properties. To overcome this limitation, a surface Cauchy–Born rule has been proposed. Several modified forms of the Cauchy–Born rule have also been proposed to cater to crystalline bodies having special shapes. Marino Arroyo and Ted Belytschko proposed a exponential Cauchy Born rule for modeling of mono-layered crystalline sheets as two-dimensional continuum shells has been proposed. A helical Cauchy–Born rule for modeling slender bodies (such as nano and continuum rods) as special Cosserat continuum rods has been proposed.

== See also ==
- Born–Huang approximation
