= Thermal dose unit =

Measurement of exposure to thermal radiation

A Thermal dose unit (TDU) is a unit of measurement used in the oil and gas industry to measure exposure to thermal radiation. It is a function of intensity (power per unit area) and exposure time.

1 TDU = 1 (kW/m^{2})^{4/3}s.

== Results of exposure ==
Level of Exposure		Result
Mean	Range	Result
92	86–103	Pain
105	80–130	Threshold First Degree Burn
290	240–350	Threshold Second Degree Burn
1000	870–2600	Threshold Third Degree Burn
