= William Francis Gray Swann =

English physicist (1884–1962)

William Francis Gray Swann (August 29, 1884 – January 29, 1962) was an English physicist.

== Education ==
He was educated at Brighton Technical College and the Royal College of Science, from which he obtained a B.Sc. in 1905. He worked as an assistant lecturer at the University of Sheffield while simultaneously pursuing a doctorate at University College London, from which he received a D.Sc. in 1910.

== Career ==
Swann left Sheffield in 1913, when he went to the United States to join the Carnegie Institute, becoming head of the Physical Division of the Department of Terrestrial Magnetism. He later became a professor at the University of Minnesota, then at the University of Chicago and Yale University, where he was appointed the director of the Yale University Sloane Laboratory. E. O. Lawrence, the 1939 Nobel Laureate in Physics, was one of Swann's graduate students at the University of Minnesota and followed his professor to Chicago and then New Haven.

In 1924, Swann was an Invited Speaker of the International Congress of Mathematicians in Toronto. In 1927, at the age of 43, he became the first director of the Bartol Research Foundation of the Franklin Institute. Among his first acts as director was to arrange a contract to locate the foundation at Swarthmore College, which is fairly close to Philadelphia. He continued as director of the foundation until his retirement in 1959, when he was replaced by Martin A. Pomerantz.

He is particularly noted for his research into cosmic rays, high-energy particle physics and Quantum mechanics. He produced over 250 publications, including his influential, popular book The Architecture of the Universe in 1934.

Joseph Valasek, one of his graduate students at the University of Minnesota, discovered hysteretic charge-voltage behavior in Rochelle salt, which led to the establishment of ferroelectricity as a field of study.

== Recognition ==
Swann was awarded the Elliott Cresson Gold Medal by the Franklin Institute in 1960. Swann has a crater on the Moon named after him (Swann crater) as well as a Glacier in Antarctica (Swann Glacier) Swann was Nominated for the Nobel Prize in Physics in 1951, 1952 and 1953 by Victor Francis Hess.

== Other interests ==
In addition to being a physicist, Swann was also an accomplished cellist, having studied under Diran Alexanian, a collaborator of Pablo Casals. Swann founded the Swarthmore Symphony Orchestra. He was also the president of the American Physical Society from 1931 to 1933, and was a member of the American Philosophical Society. He retired in 1959.

== Death ==
W..F.G. Swann died in 1962 in Swarthmore, Pennsylvania. He is buried at Chebeague Island Cemetery on Chebeague Island, Maine.
