= Born–Huang approximation =

Approximation in quantum chemistry

The Born–Huang approximation is an approximation closely related to the Born–Oppenheimer approximation. It takes into account diagonal nonadiabatic effects in the electronic Hamiltonian better than the Born–Oppenheimer approximation. Despite the addition of correction terms, the electronic states remain uncoupled under the Born–Huang approximation, making it an adiabatic approximation. The approximation is named after Max Born and Huang Kun who wrote about it in the Dynamical Theory of Crystal Lattices.

== Shape ==
The Born–Huang approximation asserts that the representation matrix of nuclear kinetic energy operator in the basis of Born–Oppenheimer electronic wavefunctions is diagonal:

$$\langle\chi_{k'}(\mathbf{r}; \mathbf{R}) | T_\mathrm{n} | \chi_k(\mathbf{r}; \mathbf{R})\rangle_{(\mathbf{r})} =
\mathcal{T}_\mathrm{k}(\mathbf{R})\delta_{k'k}.$$

== Consequences ==
The Born–Huang approximation loosens the Born–Oppenheimer approximation by including some electronic matrix elements, while at the same time maintains its diagonal structure in the nuclear equations of motion. As a result, the nuclei still move on isolated surfaces, obtained by the addition of a small correction to the Born–Oppenheimer potential energy surface.

Under the Born–Huang approximation, the Schrödinger equation of the molecular system simplifies to

$$\left[ T_\mathrm{n} +E_k(\mathbf{R})+\mathcal{T}_\mathrm{k}(\mathbf{R})\right] \phi_k(\mathbf{R}) =
E \phi_k(\mathbf{R})
\quad\text{for}\quad k=1, \ldots, K.$$

The quantity $\left[E_k(\mathbf{R})+\mathcal{T}_\mathrm{k}(\mathbf{R})\right]$ serves as the corrected potential energy surface.

== Upper-bound property ==
The value of Born–Huang approximation is that it provides the upper bound for the ground-state energy. The Born–Oppenheimer approximation, on the other hand, provides the lower bound for this value.

== See also ==
- Vibronic coupling
- Born–Oppenheimer approximation
- Cauchy–Born rule
