= Joseph Valasek =

American physicist (1897–1993)

- Born: 27 April 1897; Cleveland, Ohio
- Died: 4 October 1993 (aged 96); Minneapolis, Minnesota
- Education: Case School of Applied Science (BS); University of Minnesota (PhD)
- Known for: Discovery of ferroelectricity
- Scientific career
- Workplaces: University of Minnesota
- Thesis: "Piezo-Electric and Allied Phenomena in Rochelle Salt" (1920)

Joseph Valasek (27 April 1897 – 4 October 1993) was an American physicist and professor emeritus of physics at the University of Minnesota. He specialized in geometrical and physical optics, experimental optics and spectroscopy, and x-rays. He is credited with the discovery of ferroelectricity, which he identified using Rochelle salts.

== Early life and education ==
Valasek was born on 27 April 1897 in Cleveland, Ohio, to parents who had immigrated from Czechoslovakia. His father worked as a journalist, office clerk, and assistant to a manager in a brewery. His maternal grandfather, Josef Pylik, was a physics teacher in Czechoslovakia.

Valasek received his BS in 1917 in physics at the Case School of Applied Science (now Case Western Reserve University). After graduating, he worked for two years at the National Bureau of Standards (now the National Institute of Standards and Technology) in Washington, D.C., where he conducted research on the annealing of optical glass. In 1920 he received his MA and in 1921 he received his PhD in physics from the University of Minnesota.

He joined the University of Minnesota staff while in graduate school, becoming a teaching assistant in 1919. After concluding graduate work at the University of Minnesota, Valasek subsequently worked at the university as a National Research Council fellow for one year.

== Career ==
Valasek discovered ferroelectricity in 1920 as a graduate student. At the point, he was working under the supervision of professor William Swann to develop a seismograph. He had observed that when placed in an electric field, the polarization of Rochelle salts increased as he turned up the field. However, when the field subsequently decreased, the polarization was always higher than before while following the same kind of curve, demonstrating hysteresis. While Valasek was unable to attend as a graduate student, professor Swann presented these findings at the April 1920 meeting of the American Physical Society at the Bureau of Standards building in Washington, D.C., in a paper entitled “Piezoelectric and allied phenomena in Rochelle salt.” Valasek formally submitted this paper in December 1920 and it was published in April 1921 in the Physical Review.

In 1920 Valasek was promoted to instructor, and in 1922, he was appointed as an assistant professor at the University of Minnesota. He continued to work at the university for the rest of his career, and was appointed to associate professor in 1927 and to full professor in 1941. For the 1928–1929 academic year, Valasek worked at the laboratory of Karl Manne Georg Siegbahn in Uppsala, Sweden. There, Valasek began investigating chemical effects in x-ray spectra and their connection with electronic energy bands in solids.

As a professor, Valasek taught courses in both theoretical and experimental optics. He retired from the University of Minnesota in 1965. In 1983 the University of Minnesota awarded Valasek an honorary Doctor of Science degree for outstanding lifetime achievements through its Institute of Technology (now the College of Science and Engineering).

He was elected in 1921 a Fellow of the American Physical Society.

== Personal life ==
Valasek's brother-in-law was Elmer Hutchisson, who was married to his sister Rose. Hutchisson served as the second director of the American Institute of Physics from 1957 to 1964.

== Publications and other work ==
- "Piezo-Electric and Allied Phenomena in Rochelle Salt," thesis submitted in 1920
- Elements of Optics (McGraw-Hill, 1928)
- Introduction to Theoretical and Experimental Optics (Wiley, 1949)
