= Dynamical Theory of Crystal Lattices =

Book by Max Born

- First edition
- Author: Max Born and Kun Huang
- Publisher: Oxford University Press
- Publication date: 1954
- Media type: Print (hardcover and paperback)
- Pages: 432
- ISBN: 0-19-850369-5
- OCLC: 40903335
- Dewey Decimal: 548/.81 21
- LC Class: QD931 .B67 1988

Dynamical Theory of Crystal Lattices is a book in solid state physics, authored collaboratively by Max Born and Kun Huang. The book was originally started by Born in c. 1940, and was finished in the 1950s by Huang in consultation with Born. The text is considered a classical treatise on the subject of lattice dynamics, phonon theory, and elasticity in crystalline solids, but excluding metals and other complex solids with order/disorder phenomena. J. D. Eshelby, Melvin Lax, and A. J. C. Wilson reviewed the book in 1955, among several others.

The book introduces the concept of Cauchy–Born rule and Born–Huang approximation.

== See also ==
- Bibliography of Max Born
- Introduction to Solid State Physics
