= Sergei Rytov =

Soviet physicist (1908–1996)

- Сергей Рытов
- Born: Sergei Mikhailovich Rytov; 3 July 1908; Kharkov, Russian Empire
- Died: 22 October 1996 (aged 88); Moscow, Russia
- Education: Moscow State University
- Known for: Rytov number; Rytov approximation; Rytov effective medium theory; Fluctuational electrodynamics
- Awards: Order of the Red Banner of Labour; A. S. Popov Gold Medal
- Scientific career
- Fields: Radiophysics, acoustics, electrodynamics
- Doctoral advisor: Leonid Mandelstam

Sergei Mikhailovich Rytov (Russian: Сергей Михайлович Рытов; 3 July 1908 – 22 October 1996) was a Soviet physicist and member of the Russian Academy of Sciences. Rytov contributed to the fields of statistical radiophysics, fluctuational electrodynamics and effective medium theory. The Rytov number for laser propagation in the atmosphere and the Rytov approximation for wave propagation in inhomogeneous media bear his name.

== Life ==
Sergei Mikhailovich Rytov was born in Kharkov, Russian Empire in 1908.

Rytov graduated from Moscow State University (MGU) in 1930, and continued his studies as a post-graduate at MGU's Research Institute of Physics, which he completed in 1933.

Later, Rytov worked at the Gorky Research Institute for Engineering Physics (1932–1934), the Lebedev Physical Institute (1934–1938), and finally in the Mints Institute of Radio Engineering until his death. He also lectured in MGU (1930 –1932 and 1934–1938), in the Gorky State University (1932–1934 and 1945–1947) and in the and at the Moscow Institute of Physics and Technology (1947–1978).

Rytov became an expert on the theory of thermal electromagnetic radiation based on the generalization of the fluctuation-dissipation theorem. Evgeny Lifshitz was inspired by Rytov's theory to develop his theory of van der Waals forces in 1955. In 1955, he introduced an analytical effective medium model for one-dimensional stratified media, which is widely used in the analysis of gratings, composites and metamaterials.

Rytov's work would later be summarized in a series of books Principles of Radiophysics, co-authored with Yurii A. Kravtsov and Valeryan I. Tatarsky on radiophysics (Russian term for the theory of linear and nonlinear wave phenomena), where he discussed a series of topics related on fluctuation phenomena in electronic systems random fields and random propagation waves.

Rytov theory would be simplified by Dirk Polder and Michael van Hove in 1971 to describe thermal radiation between closely spaced bodies. This led to the development of near-field radiative heat transfer theory, to which Rytov also contributed later.

Rytov was well known for his pedagogic skills.

== Awards ==
- Three Orders of the Red Banner of Labour
- Order of the Badge of Honour
- USSR State Prize (1990)
- A. S. Popov Gold Medal (1959) for a series of works in the field of statistical radiophysics.
- Mandeshltam Prize.

== Books ==
- Rytov, S. M. (1953). Theory of Electrical Fluctuations and Thermal Radiation. USSR: Publishing House, Russian Academy of Sciences.
- Levin, M. L.; Rytov, S. M. (1967). Theory of equilibrium thermal fluctuations in electrodynamics. Moscow: Science Publishing.
- Rytov, Sergei; Kravtsov, Y. A.; Tatarsky, V. I. (1987). Principles of Statistical Radiophysics. Vol. 1. Elements of Random Process Theory. Springer-Verlag.
- Rytov, Sergei; Kravtsov, Y. A.; Tatarsky, V. I. (1988). Principles of Statistical Radiophysics. Vol. 2. Correlation Theory and Random Processes. Springer-Verlag.
- Rytov, Sergei; Kravtsov, Y. A.; Tatarsky, V. I. (1989). Principles of Statistical Radiophysics. Vol. 3. Elements of Random Fields. Springer-Verlag.
- Rytov, Sergei; Kravtsov, Y. A.; Tatarsky, V. I. (1989). Principles of Statistical Radiophysics. Vol. 4. Wave Propagation Through Random Media. Springer-Verlag.
