= Huang Kun =

Chinese physicist (1919–2005)

- 黄昆
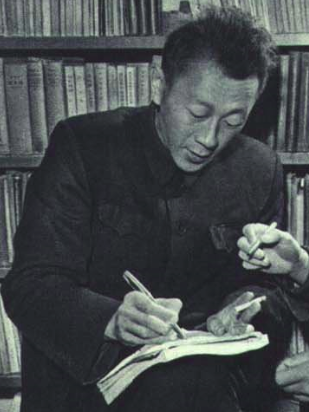
- Huang in 1963
- Born: 2 September 1919; Jiaxing, Zhejiang, Republic of China
- Died: 6 July 2005 (aged 85); Beijing, People's Republic of China
- Education: Yenching University; National Southwestern Associated University; University of Bristol
- Known for: Born–Huang approximation
- Awards: Highest Science and Technology Award (2001)
- Scientific career
- Fields: Solid-state physics Semiconductor
- Workplaces: Institute of Semiconductors, Chinese Academy of Sciences
- Thesis: Some considerations in the theory of alloys, together with a discussion of the binding energies of the lightest nuclei (1948)
- Doctoral advisor: Nevill Mott

Chinese name
- Simplified Chinese: 黄昆
- Traditional Chinese: 黃昆
Transcriptions
Standard Mandarin
- Hanyu Pinyin: Huáng Kūn

Huang Kun (Chinese: 黄昆; September 2, 1919 – July 6, 2005) was a Chinese physicist and an academician of the Chinese Academy of Sciences. He was influential in the establishment of solid-state physics in China. He is known for his various contributions to solid-state physics including the Huang diffraction, early theory of polaritons, the Born–Huang approximation, the Huang–Rhys factor and the Huang–Zhu model.

He was awarded the State Preeminent Science and Technology Award (the highest science award in China) by President Jiang Zemin in 2001.

== Life ==
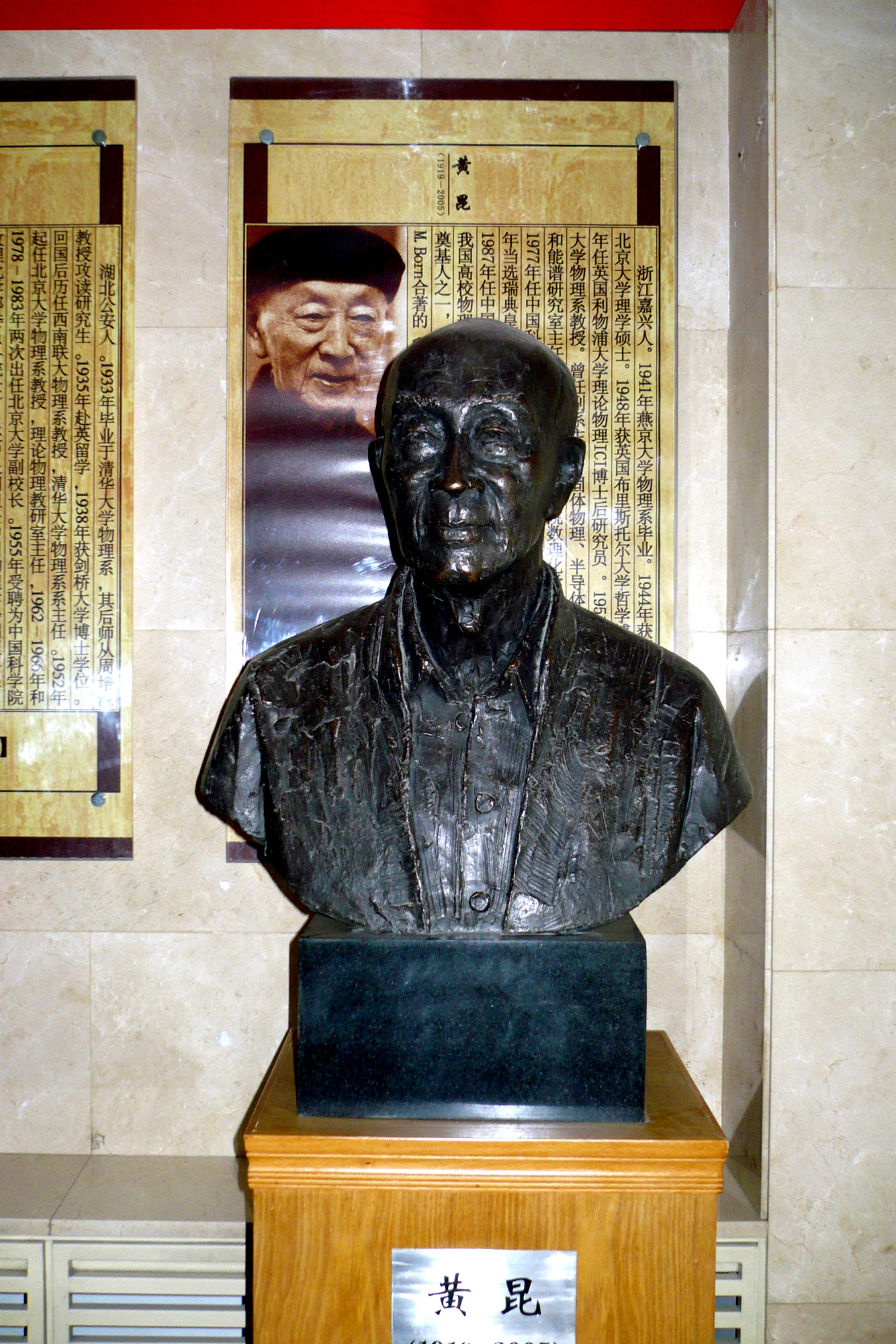
Bronze bust of Huang Kun at Physics department, Peking University

Born in Jiaxing, China, in September 1919. He got a bachelor degree from Yenching University in physics. He enrolled as a graduate student at National Southwestern Associated University, other students with him included C.N. Yang. There Ta-You Wu gave Huang and Yang courses on classical and quantum mechanics. Huang carried out a thesis on atomic and molecular problems in astrophysics, supervised by professor Wu.

In 1948, he earned his PhD from the H. H. Wills Physics Lab of Bristol University in England. His supervisor was Nevill Mott. In his thesis, he worked on the effect of dissolved solute atoms to X-ray diffraction in dilute solid solution. His research was confirmed 20 years later. His theory became known as Huang diffusive scattering (HDS).

He continued his postdoctoral studies at Liverpool University, where he coauthored the book Dynamical Theory of Crystal Lattices with Max Born between 1949 and 1951. The book has become a classic work of modern physics. The Born–Huang approximation is named after them.

During his studies he also was influenced by Herbert Fröhlich. In 1950, Huang published a theory for the interaction of a crystal lattice and electrons. Later his equation led to the concept of phonon polaritons, described partially by Huang equation. The same year, with his secretary Avril Rhys, he calculated the average emitted phonons in a electronic transition in crystallographic defect. The formula they developed is known as the Huang–Rhys factor. A year later, he would marry Rhys.

In 1951, Huang returned to China to teach, and became a professor of physics at Peking University.

During the Cultural Revolution, Huang was one of the scientists to still write in the political journal Red Flag.

In 1955, he became a founding member of the Chinese Academy of Sciences (CAS). Huang and Xie Xide started the research of semiconductors in China, and established the solid state physics major at Peking University. In 1977, Huang became the director of the Institute of Semiconductors at CAS.

In 1988, he and Bangfen Zhu published a paper on optical vibrations. Their theory became known as the Huang–Zhu model.

=== Retirement ===
After his retirement in 1983, Huang remained active in the research of semiconductors and was selected as the chairman of the Chinese Society of Physics between 1987 and 1991. He served as Director of the Institute of Semiconductors of the CAS.

== Honors and awards ==
Huang was elected member of the Chinese Academy of Science (CAS) in 1955. He was elected Foreign Member of the Royal Swedish Academy of Sciences in 1980. Elected fellow of The World Academy of Sciences in 1985. He received the Tan Kah Kee Award from the CAS in 1996. In 2001, Huang and Wang Xuan received the State Preeminent Science and Technology Award by President Jiang Zemin.
