= Zhu Bangfen =

Chinese physicist

Zhu Bangfen is a Chinese physicist and professor at Tsinghua University. He was the Editor-in-Chief of Chinese Physics Letters.

== Education and career ==
He obtained a degree in applied physics from Tsinghua University in 1970 and a master's degree in solid-state physics from the same university in 1981. Between 1971 and 1978, he served as a technician at Jiangxi Copper, China. Between 1981 and 1987, he was an assistant professor at the Institute of Semiconductors, Chinese Academy of Sciences, where he later became a full professor between 1999 and 2000.

In 2003, he was elected a fellow of the Chinese Academy of Sciences, and in 2012, he became a fellow of the Institute of Physics.
