= Near-field radiative heat transfer =

Branch of radiative heat transfer

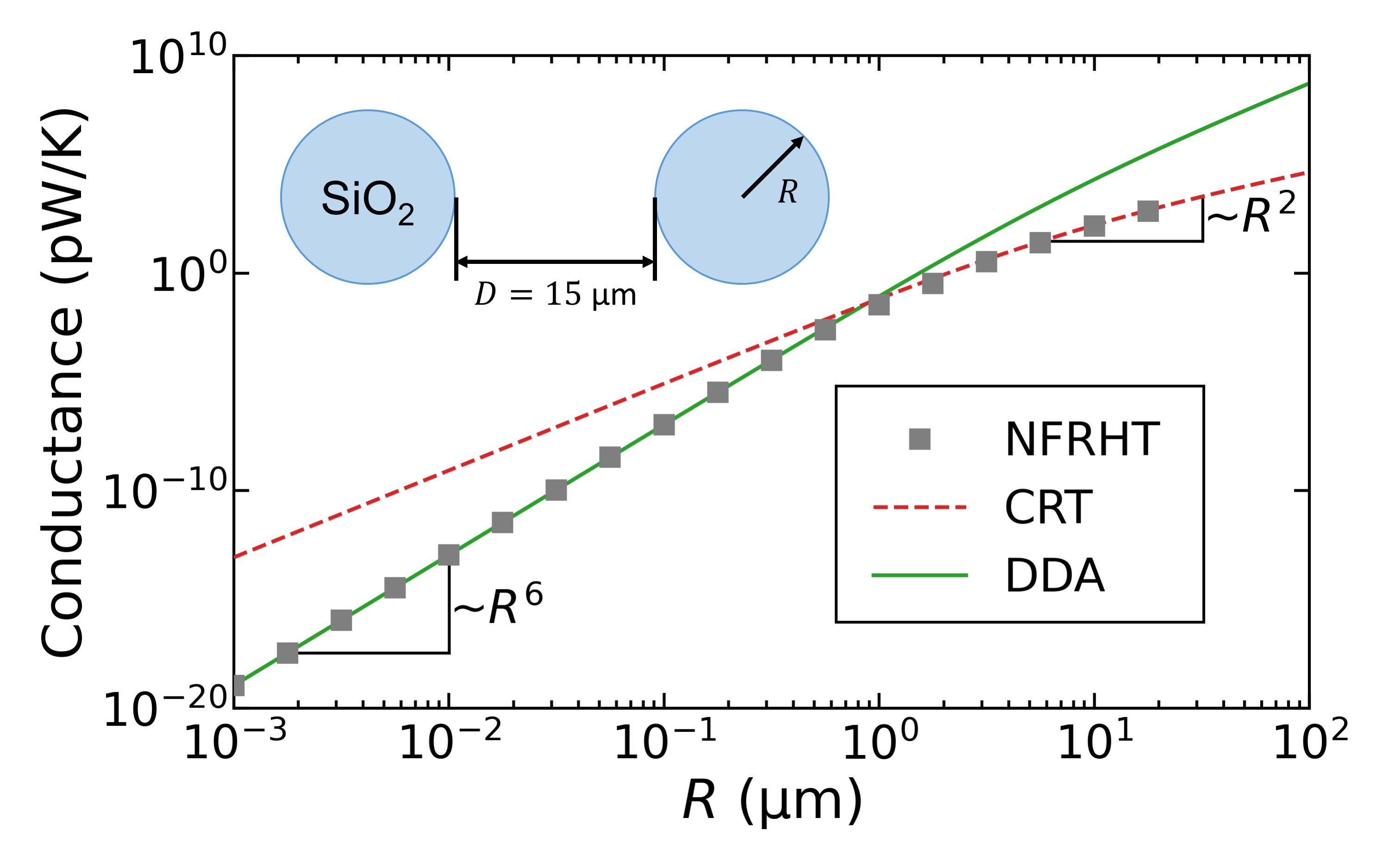
Prediction of radiative heat transfer between two spheres computed using near-field (NFRHT), classical (CRT), and discrete dipole (DDA) methods.

Near-field radiative heat transfer (NFRHT) is a branch of radiative heat transfer which deals with situations for which the objects and/or distances separating objects are comparable or smaller in scale or to the dominant wavelength of thermal radiation exchanging thermal energy. In this regime, the assumptions of geometrical optics inherent to classical radiative heat transfer are not valid and the effects of diffraction, interference, and tunneling of electromagnetic waves can dominate the net heat transfer. These "near-field effects" can result in heat transfer rates exceeding the blackbody limit of classical radiative heat transfer.

== History ==
The origin of the field of NFRHT is commonly traced to the work of Sergei M. Rytov in the Soviet Union. Rytov examined the case of a semi-infinite absorbing body separated by a vacuum gap from a near-perfect mirror at zero temperature. He treated the source of thermal radiation as randomly fluctuating electromagnetic fields. Later in the United States, various groups theoretically examined the effects of wave interference and evanescent wave tunneling. In 1971, Dirk Polder and Michel Van Hove published the first fully correct formulation of NFRHT between arbitrary non-magnetic media. They examined the case of two half-spaces separated by a small vacuum gap. Polder and Van Hove used the fluctuation-dissipation theorem to determine the statistical properties of the randomly fluctuating currents responsible for thermal emission and demonstrated definitively that evanescent waves were responsible for super-Planckian (exceeding the blackbody limit) heat transfer across small gaps.

Since the work of Polder and Van Hove, significant progress has been made in predicting NFRHT. Theoretical formalisms involving trace formulas, fluctuating surface currents, and dyadic Green's functions, have all been developed. Though identical in result, each formalism can be more or less convenient when applied to different situations. Exact solutions for NFRHT between two spheres, ensembles of spheres, a sphere and a half-space, and concentric cylinders have all been determined using these various formalisms. NFRHT in other geometries has been addressed primarily through finite element methods. Meshed surface and volume methods have been developed which handle arbitrary geometries. Alternatively, curved surfaces can be discretized into pairs of flat surfaces and approximated to exchange energy like two semi-infinite half spaces using a thermal proximity approximation (sometimes referred to as the Derjaguin approximation). In systems of small particles, the discrete dipole approximation can be applied.

== Theory ==
=== Fundamentals ===
Most modern works on NFRHT express results in the form of a Landauer formula. Specifically, the net heat power transferred from body 1 to body 2 is given by

$$P_{\mathrm{1 \rightarrow 2,net}} = \int_{0}^{\infty}\left\{ \frac{\hbar \omega}{2 \pi} \left[ n(\omega,T_{1}) - n(\omega,T_{2}) \right] \mathcal{T}(\omega) \right\} d\omega$$,

where $\hbar$ is the reduced Planck constant, $\omega$ is the angular frequency, $T$ is the thermodynamic temperature, $n(\omega,T)=\left(1/2\right) \left[ \coth{\left(\hbar \omega / 2 k_{b} T\right)} - 1 \right]$ is the Bose function, $k_{b}$ is the Boltzmann constant, and

$$\mathcal{T}(\omega) = \sum_{\alpha}\tau_{\alpha}(\omega)$$.

The Landauer approach writes the transmission of heat in terms discrete of thermal radiation channels, $\alpha$. The individual channel probabilities, $\tau_{\alpha}$, take values between 0 and 1.

NFRHT is sometimes alternatively reported as a linearized conductance, given by

$$G_{\mathrm{1 \rightarrow 2,net}}(T) = \lim_{T_{1}, T_{2} \rightarrow T} \frac{P_{\mathrm{1 \rightarrow 2,net}}}{T_{1}-T_{2}} = \int_{0}^{\infty}\left[ \frac{\hbar \omega}{2 \pi} \frac{\partial n}{\partial T} \mathcal{T}(\omega) \right] d\omega$$.

=== Two half-spaces ===
For two half-spaces, the radiation channels, $\alpha$, are the s- and p- linearly polarized waves. The transmission probabilities are given by

$$\tau_{\alpha}(\omega) = \int_{0}^{\infty} \left[ \frac{k_{\rho}}{2\pi} \widehat{\tau}_{\alpha}(\omega) \right] dk_{\rho},$$

where $k_{\rho}$ is the component of the wavevector parallel to the surface of the half-space. Further,

$$\widehat{\tau}_{\alpha}(\omega) = \begin{cases}
\frac{\left( 1 - \left| r_{0,1}^{\alpha} \right|^{2} \right)\left( 1 - \left| r_{0,2}^{\alpha} \right|^{2} \right)}{\left| 1 - r_{0,1}^{\alpha} r_{0,2}^{\alpha} \exp{\left(2 i k_{z,0} l \right)} \right|^{2}} , & \text{if } k_{\rho} \le \omega/c \\
\frac{4 \Im{\left( r_{0,1}^{\alpha} \right)} \Im{\left( r_{0,2}^{\alpha} \right)} \exp{\left(-2 \left| k_{z,0} \right| l \right)}}{\left| 1 - r_{0,1}^{\alpha} r_{0,2}^{\alpha} \exp{\left(-2 \left| k_{z,0} \right| l \right)} \right|^{2}}, & \text{if } k_{\rho} > \omega/c,
\end{cases}$$

where:

- $r_{0,j}^{\alpha}$ are the Fresnel reflection coefficients for $\alpha=s,p$ polarized waves between media 0 and $j=1,2$,
- $k_{z,0} = \sqrt{(\omega/c)^2-k_{\rho}^{2}}$ is the component of the wavevector in the region 0 perpendicular to the surface of the half-space,
- $l$ is the separation distance between the two half-spaces, and
- $c$ is the speed of light in vacuum.

Contributions to heat transfer for which $k_{\rho} \le \omega/c$ arise from propagating waves whereas contributions from $k_{\rho} > \omega/c$ arise from evanescent waves.

== Applications ==
- Thermophotovoltaic energy conversion
- Thermal rectification
- Localized cooling
- Heat-assisted magnetic recording
