= Rytov number =

Fundamental scaling parameter for laser propagation through atmospheric turbulence

The Rytov number is a fundamental scaling parameter for laser propagation through atmospheric turbulence. Rytov numbers greater than 0.2 are generally considered to be strong scintillation. A Rytov number of 0 would indicate no turbulence, thus no scintillation of the beam.
