= Dirk Polder =

Dutch physicist (1919–2001)

- Dirk Polder
- Born: 23 August 1919; The Hague, Netherlands
- Died: 18 March 2001 (aged 81); Iran
- Education: University of Leiden
- Known for: Casimir–Polder effect Polder tensor Near-field radiative heat transfer
- Scientific career
- Fields: Physicist
- Workplaces: Philips Research Laboratories; Delft University of Technology
- Doctoral advisor: W. J. de Haas, H. B. G. Casimir

Dirk Polder (23 August 1919 – 18 March 2001) was a Dutch physicist working on solid-state physics, magnetism, molecular physics and nanoscale physics.

Together with Hendrik Casimir, Polder first predicted the existence of what today is known as the Casimir-Polder force, sometimes also referred to as the Casimir effect or Casimir force. Using a similar theory, he developed the formalism to treat radiative heat transfer at the nanoscale.

== Biography ==
=== Early life ===
Dirk Polder was born in 1919 in The Hague, Netherlands. His father was a Delft engineer and his mother was the daughter of a minister. Music was very important for his family and Dirk played the cello and played frequently in quartets.

After completing his HBS (Hogere Burgerschool) in mathematics and physics, he enrolled at Leiden University in 1936 where obtained a Bachelor of Science in physics and chemistry in 1939. He completed a master's degree in experimental and theoretical physics in 1941, before exams were banned after the German invasion of the Netherlands during World War II.

=== Research career ===
In 1938 he did an internship with Jan Ketelaar on inorganic chemistry which resulted in his first publication on the crystal structure of thallium salts.

In 1939 he became an assistant to Wander Johannes de Haas at the Kamerlingh-Onnes Institute in Leiden, where he worked together with Hendrik Casimir and carried out experiments on the adiabatic demagnetization of various paramagnetic salts using crystal field theory. In 1941 he received his doctorate. Due to the deteriorating conditions at Leiden after German occupation and threat of forced labor, he decided to move to the Philips Research Laboratory in Eindhoven in early 1943. After the end of the war, Polder went to the HH Wills Laboratory at the University of Bristol in 1947 to work on research with Nevill Francis Mott. At the end of September 1948 he returned to the Netherlands, but in October 1950, prompted by an invitation from Mott, Polder decided to go back to Bristol, where he became a lecturer.

Polder met M. L. Everaars in Eindhoven. The couple married on July 19, 1950.

In 1955 he returned to Eindhoven and became a scientific advisor and head of basic research at the Philips Research Laboratory until his retirement in 1979. In 1959 he became a professor at the Technical University of Delft (until 1986 Technische Hogeschool van Delft ), where he lectured on quantum mechanics and theoretical solid state physics until 1984.

He died in 2001 during a trip to Iran with his wife.

== Research topics ==
He became known through a theoretical work published together with Casimir in 1948, in which the interaction between an electrically neutral atom and a neighboring perfectly conducting plate, caused by quantum mechanical and thermal fluctuations in the electromagnetic field, and described using quantum electrodynamics. This force was later named Casimir–Polder force after the authors of the work.

In 1971, Polder and Michael van Hove pioneered the field of near-field radiative heat transfer theory simplifying the fluctuational electrodynamics formulas of Sergei Rytov.

In 1979 Polder worked on theory of ferromagnetic resonance. He generalized the phenomenological description given by Charles Kittel for a homogeneously magnetized ellipsoid by deriving the tensorial relationship. The tensor in question is now known as the 'Polder tensor' and provides a basis for the phenomenological description of all kinds of periodic phenomena in ferromagnetic media, such as the propagation of electromagnetic waves, which Polder has treated himself.

Polder was intensively involved in developments in semiconductor physics. With Harold J.G. Meijer, he studied the scattering of electrons by lattice vibrations in polar crystals of low symmetry. With his student Leo J. van der Pauw, Polder worked om the influence of light on thermoelectric power. Experiments by A. H. Harten on the dependence of the photovoltage on the penetration depth of light found were satisfactory explained by considering the influence of the surface space charge layer as suggested by Polder. Other works include the study of noise in transistor-like devices with his student A. Baelde, and an article on superlinear photoconductivity with E. N. Hooge.

Polder also worked on X-rays and crystallography in the 1960s. Together with P. Penning, Polder devoted several studies to the anomalous transmission of X-rays, the phenomenon of reducing attenuation when passing through a perfect crystal if the direction of propagation matches Bragg reflection at one or more lattice planes.

Polder's latest physics publications were devoted to superfluorescence, intrigued by the experiments of H. M. Gibbs and Q. H. F. Vrehen.

== Honors and fellowships ==
In 1978 Polder was elected member of the Royal Netherlands Academy of Arts and Sciences.
