= Introduction to Solid State Physics =

Classic textbook in by Charles Kittel

- Second edition (1956)
- Author: Charles Kittel
- Language: English
- Subject: Condensed matter physics; Solid state physics
- Publisher: John Wiley and Sons
- Publication date: 1953 (1st ed.)
- Publication place: United States
- Pages: 396 (1st ed.); 680 (8th ed.)
- ISBN: 978-1-119-45416-8
- OCLC: 787838554
- Dewey Decimal: 530.4
- LC Class: QC176.K5
- Identifiers refer to the 8th edition of the book, printed in 2005, unless otherwise noted

Introduction to Solid State Physics, known colloquially as Kittel, is a classic condensed matter physics textbook written by American physicist Charles Kittel in 1953. The book has been highly influential and has seen widespread adoption; Marvin L. Cohen remarked in 2019 that Kittel's content choices in the original edition played a large role in defining the field of solid-state physics. It was also the first proper textbook covering this new field of physics. The book is published by John Wiley and Sons and, as of 2018, it is in its ninth edition and has been reprinted many times as well as translated into over a dozen languages, including Chinese, French, German, Hungarian, Indonesian, Italian, Japanese, Korean, Malay, Romanian, Russian, Spanish, and Turkish. In some later editions, the eighteenth chapter, titled Nanostructures, was written by Paul McEuen. Along with its competitor Ashcroft and Mermin, the book is considered a standard textbook in condensed matter physics.

== Background ==
Kittel received his PhD from the University of Wisconsin–Madison in 1941 under his advisor Gregory Breit. Before being promoted to professor of physics at UC Berkeley in 1951, Kittel held several other positions. He worked for the Naval Ordnance Laboratory from 1940 to 1942, was a research physicist in the US Navy until 1945, worked at the Research Laboratory of Electronics at MIT from 1945 to 1947 and at Bell Labs from 1947 to 1951, and was a visiting associate professor at UC Berkeley from 1950 until his promotion.

Henry Ehrenreich has noted that before the first edition of Introduction to Solid State Physics came out in 1953, there were no other textbooks on the subject; rather, the young field's study material was spread across several prominent articles and treatises. The field of solid state physics was very new at the time of writing and was defined by only a few treatises that, in the Ehrenreich's view, expounded rather than explained the topics and were not suitable as textbooks.

== Content ==
The book covers a wide range of topics in solid state physics, including Bloch's theorem, crystals, magnetism, phonons, Fermi gases, magnetic resonance, and surface physics. The chapters are broken into sections that highlight the topics.

Table of contents (8th ed.)
Chapter	Title	Topics
1	Crystal Structure	Crystal structure
2	Wave Diffraction and the Reciprocal Lattice	diffraction, Bragg Law, Fourier analysis, reciprocal lattice vectors, Laue equations, Brillouin zone, atomic form factor
3	Crystal Binding and Elastic Constants	Van der Waals force, Ionic crystals, covalent crystals, metals
4	Phonons I. Crystal Vibrations	phonons
5	Phonons II. Thermal Properties	phonons
6	Free Electron Fermi Gas	Fermi gas, free electron model
7	Energy Bands	nearly free electron model, Bloch's theorem, Kronig-Penney model, crystal momentum
8	Semiconductor Crystals	band gap, electron holes, semimetals, superlattices
9	Fermi Surfaces and Metals	Fermi surfaces
10	Superconductivity	superconductivity, BCS theory, superconductors
11	Diamagnetism and Paramagnetism	diamagnetism and paramagnetism
12	Ferromagnetism and Antiferromagnetism	ferromagnetism and antiferromagnetism
13	Magnetic Resonance	magnetic resonance
14	Plasmons, Polaritons, and Polarons	plasmons, polaritons, polarons
15	Optical Processes and Excitons	excitons, Kramers-Kronig relations
16	Dielectrics And Ferroelectrics	Maxwell equations in matter
17	Surface and Interface Physics	surface physics
18	Nanostructures (by Paul McEuen)	electron microscopy, optical microscopy
19	Noncrystalline Solids	glasses
20	Point Defects	lattice defects
21	Dislocations	shear strength of crystals, dislocations, hardness of materials
22	Alloys	Hume-Rothery rules, electrical conductivity, Kondo effect

== Reception ==
Marvin L. Cohen and Morrel H. Cohen, in an obituary for Kittel in 2019, remarked that the original book "was not only the dominant text for teaching in the field, it was on the bookshelf of researchers in academia and industry throughout the world", though they did not provide any time frame on when it may have been surpassed as the dominant text. They also noted that Kittel's content choices played a large role in defining the field of solid-state physics.

The book is a classic textbook in the subject and has seen use as a comparative benchmark in the reviews of other books in condensed matter physics. In a 1969 review of another book, Robert G. Chambers noted that there were not many textbooks covering these topics, as "since 1953, Kittel's classic Introduction to Solid State Physics has dominated the field so effectively that few competitors have appeared", noting that the third edition continues that legacy. Before continuing, the reviewer noted that the book was too long for some uses and that less thorough works would be welcome.

- Several notable reviews of the first edition were published in 1954, including Arthur James Cochran Wilson, Leslie Fleetwood Bates, and Kenneth Standley, among others.
- Gwyn Owain Jones reviewed the book in 1955.
- The second edition of the book was reviewed by Robert W. Hellwarth in 1957 and Leslie Fleetwood Bates, among others.
- The third edition of the book also received reviews, including one by Donald F. Holcomb.
- A German translation of the book has also received several reviews.

== Publication history ==
=== Original editions ===
- Kittel, Charles (1953). Introduction to solid state physics (1st ed.). New York: Wiley. p. 396. OCLC 859669173.
- Kittel, Charles (1956). Introduction to solid state physics (2nd ed.). New York: Wiley. p. 617. OCLC 746139663.
- Kittel, Charles (1966). Introduction to solid state physics (3rd ed.). New York; London: Wiley. p. 613. OCLC 1159631475.
- Kittel, Charles (1971). Introduction to solid state physics (4th ed.). New York: John Wiley & Sons. p. 766. ISBN 978-0-471-49021-0. OCLC 802643946.
- Kittel, Charles (1976). Introduction to solid state physics (5th ed.). New York: Wiley. p. 673. ISBN 978-0-471-49024-1. OCLC 908887143.
- Kittel, Charles (1986). Introduction to solid state physics (6th ed.). New York: Wiley. p. 646. ISBN 978-0-471-87474-4. OCLC 797201261.
- Kittel, Charles (1996). Introduction to solid state physics (7th ed.). New York: Wiley. p. 673. ISBN 978-0-471-11181-8. OCLC 263625446.
- Kittel, Charles (2005). Introduction to solid state physics (8th ed.). New York: Wiley. p. 680. ISBN 978-0-471-68057-4. OCLC 787838554.
- Kittel, Charles; McEuen, Paul (2018). Introduction to solid state physics (Global ed.,9th ed.). New Jersey: Wiley. p. 692. ISBN 978-1-119-45416-8. OCLC 1097548279.

=== Reprints ===
- Kittel, Charles (1954) [1953]. Introduction to solid state physics (1st ed.). New York: John Wiley and Sons. p. 396. OCLC 1123251585.
- Kittel, Charles (1967). Introduction to solid state physics (3rd ed.). New York: Wiley. p. 648. OCLC 230149869.
- Kittel, Charles (1987). Introduction to solid state physics (6th ed.). New delhi: Wiley Eastern Ltd. p. 599. OCLC 772488914.
- Kittel, Charles (2011). Introduction to solid state physics (8th ed.). Hoboken, NJ: Wiley. p. 680. ISBN 978-0-471-41526-8. OCLC 730010889.
- Kittel, Charles (2013). Introduction to solid state physics (8th ed.). New Jersey: Wiley. p. 680. ISBN 978-0-471-41526-8. OCLC 820453856.
- Kittel, Charles; McEuen, Paul (2015). Introduction to solid state physics (8th ed.). New Delhi: Wiley. p. 680. ISBN 978-81-265-3518-7. OCLC 987438137.

=== Foreign translations ===
Language	Title	Translators	Year	Publisher	Location	Identifiers
Spanish	Introduccion a la física del estado sólido (in Spanish).		1965	Reverte	Barcelona	OCLC 1097704401
Hungarian	Bevezetés a szilárdtestfizikába (in Hungarian).	Ferenc Kedves	1966	Műszaki Kiadó	Budapest	OCLC 895275633
Arabic	al-Mabādiʼ al-asasiyah fi fizyāʼ al-jawāmid (in Arabic).	Mahmūd Mukhtār	1968	Maktabat al-Nahdah al-Misriyah nushir haḍa al-kitạb maʻah muassasat Frankilīn; Mūassasat Frankilīn	al-Qāhirah; al-Qāhirah; New York	OCLC 18156712
Japanese	固体物理学入門. 上 上 (in Japanese).	良清 宇野	1968	丸善	Tokyo	OCLC 673599602
Romanian	Introducere în fizica corpului solid (in Romanian).	Anatolie Hristev; Cornelia C. Rusu	1972	Editura Tehnică	Bucureşti	OCLC 895553854
French	Introduction à la physique de l'état solide (in French) (3rd ed.).	Alain Honnart	1972	Dunod	Paris	OCLC 25192813; ISBN 978-2-04-005248-5
Japanese	固体物理学入門. 上 上 (in Japanese).		1974	丸善	Tokyo	OCLC 33543405
Russian	Vvedenie v fiziku tverdogo tela (in Russian).	A. A Gusev	1978	"Nauka", Glav. red. fiziko-matematicheskoĭ lit-ry	Moskva	OCLC 22540726
Japanese	固体物理学入門. 上 (in Japanese).	Ryōsei Uno	1978	丸善	Tōkyō	OCLC 47405134
Modern Greek	Eisagōgē stē physikē stereas katastaseōs (in Greek) (5th ed.).	C. Papageorgopoulos	1976	G. Pneumatikou	Athēna	OCLC 21774626
Chinese	固態物理學概論 / Gu tai wu li xue gai lun (in Chinese).	翁上林	1979	臺北市徐氏基金會	臺北市	OCLC 681443056
Spanish	Introduccion a la física del estado sólido (in Spanish) (2 ed.).	Serna Alcaraz, J., Serna Alcaraz, C. R., Piqueras de Noriega, J.	1981	Reverté	Barcelona	OCLC 46327300; ISBN 978-84-291-4075-0
Czech	Úvod do fyziky pevných látek: celost. vysokošk. učebnice pro stud. matematicko-fyz. a přírodověd. fakult (in Czech).	Miloš Matyáš	1985	Academia	Praha	OCLC 39420310
Japanese	Kotai butsurigaku nyūmon (in Japanese).	Uno, Ryōsei., 宇野, 良清	1988	丸善		OCLC 673243413; ISBN 978-4-621-03250-3
Malay	Pengenalan fizik keadaan pepejal (in Malay).	Khiruddin Abdullah; Karsono Ahmad Dasuki	1995	Penerbit Universiti Sains Malaysia	Pulau Pinang	OCLC 850076803; ISBN 978-983-861-100-8
Korean	고체물리학 = Introduction to solid state physics (in Korean) (Kaejŏng 7-p'an ed.).	U, Chong-ch'ŏn., 우종천.	1997	Pŏmhan Sŏjok Chusik Hoesa	Sŏul	OCLC 38038777; ISBN 978-89-7129-087-3
Japanese	固体物理学入門. 上 上 (in Japanese) (Dai 7-han ed.).	Ryōsei Uno, 良清 宇野	1998	Maruzen	Tōkyō	OCLC 38943576; ISBN 978-4-621-04423-0
Polish	Wstęp do fizyki ciała stałego (in Polish).	Wiesława Korczak	1999	Wydawnictwo Naukowe PWN	Warszawa	OCLC 41259843; ISBN 978-83-01-12706-0
Japanese	Kotai butsurigaku nyūmon. jō (in Japanese).	Uno, Ryōsei., Tsuya, Noboru., Niizeki, Komajirō., 宇野, 良清, 津屋, 昇	2005	Maruzen	Tōkyō	OCLC 676541713; ISBN 978-4-621-07653-8
German	Einführung in die Festkörperphysik (in German) (14., überarb. und erw. Aufl ed.).	Siegfried Hunklinger	2005	München Wien Oldenbourg	München	OCLC 163412454; ISBN 978-3-486-57723-5
Chinese	Gu tai wu li xue dao lun (Er ban ed.).	Hong, Lian-hui (wu li xue), Liu, Li-ji., Wei, Rong-jun., Kittel, Charles, 1916-, 洪連輝 (物理學), 劉立基.	2006	Gao li	Tai bei xian wu gu xiang	OCLC 176861489; ISBN 978-986-412-348-3
French	Physique de l'état solide: cours et problèmes (in French).	Paul McEuen	2007	Dunod	Paris	OCLC 213053150; ISBN 978-2-10-049710-2
Italian	Introduzione alla fisica dello stato solido (in Italian).	Ennio Bonetti; Carlo Bottani; Franco Ciccacci	2008	C.E.A.	Milano	OCLC 860462787; ISBN 978-88-08-18362-0
Turkish	Katı hal fiziğine giriş (in Turkish) (Sekizinci baskıdan çeviri ed.).	Gülsen Önengüt; Demir Önengüt; H İbrahim Somyürek	2014	Palme Yayıncılık	Ankara	OCLC 949367956; ISBN 978-605-355-225-3
Spanish	Introducción a la fisica del estado sólido (in Spanish).	J. Anguilar Peris; J. de la Rubia Pacheco	2018	Reverté	Barcelona	OCLC 1083203050; ISBN 978-84-291-4317-1
Korean	Goche mullihak (in Korean).	Ujongcheon., Sin, Seongcheol., Yu, Geonho., I, Seongik., I, Jaeil.	2019	Tekseuteu Bukseu	Seoul	OCLC 1128665713; ISBN 978-89-93543-78-0
Polish	Wstęp do fizyki ciała stałego (in Polish) (Wyd. 5, 3 dodr ed.).	Wiesława Korczak; Tadeusz Skośkiewicz; Andrzej Wiśniewski; Wydawnictwo Naukowe PWN	2012	Wydawnictwo Naukowe PWN	Warszawa	OCLC 803803518; ISBN 978-83-01-16804-9

== See also ==
- List of textbooks on classical mechanics and quantum mechanics
- List of textbooks in electromagnetism
