= Richard Makinson =

Australian physicist

Richard Elliss Bodenham Makinson
- Born: 5 May 1913; Burwood, Sydney
- Died: 15 January 1979 (aged 65); Wahroonga, Sydney
- Other name: Dick
- Education: Sydney Church of England Grammar School (Shore) . University of Sydney. St John's College, Cambridge.
- Occupation: lecturer in physics at the University of Sydney
- Political party: Communist Party of Great Britain
- Awards: Norbert Quirk prize. John Coutts scholarship.

Richard Elliss Bodenham Makinson (5 May 1913 – 15 January 1979), also R.E.B. or Dick Makinson, was an Australian physicist and communist activist, known for his contributions to solid-state physics and amorphous semiconductors.

Makinson was born in Burwood a suburb in the Inner West of Sydney. He first enrolled at North Sydney Boys High School and later completed secondary education at Sydney Church of England Grammar (Shore) School. He graduated with first-class honours in physics from the University of Sydney in 1935. Later he traveled to England where he was awarded a PhD in physics from the University of Cambridge in 1939.

Makinson contributed to the understanding of thermal conductivity in crystals. His work in this area is cited in the classical book Introduction to Solid State Physics by Charles Kittel. He also contributed to the physics of amorphous semiconductors. This research is cited in the book Quantum Electron Theory of Amorphous Conductors.

During the Cold War, Makinson was suspected of communist sympathies and explicitly denounced by noted anti-communist William Wentworth. As a result, he was denied a number of teaching positions, including a research chair at Sydney University, where he taught from 1939 to 1968.

Makinson was a friend and colleague of John Clive Ward and assisted in the creation of the physics program at Macquarie University where he obtained a position in 1968. In the late 1970s he was a supporter of the Macquarie science reform movement.

Makinson died of cancer, at Wahroonga, a northern suburb of Sydney, in 1979.
