= Alessio Zaccone =

Italian physicist

- Born: September 7, 1981
- Education: Politecnico di Torino; ETH Zurich
- Known for: Krausser-Samwer-Zaccone equation
- Scientific career
- Fields: Physics, Chemistry
- Workplaces: University of Milan; University of Cambridge; Queens' College, Cambridge; Technical University of Munich; ETH Zurich
- Thesis: (2010)
- Doctoral advisor: M. Morbidelli
- Other academic advisors: Eugene Terentjev, Hans Jürgen Herrmann

Alessio Zaccone (born 7 September 1981, Alessandria) is an Italian physicist.

== Career and research ==
After a PhD at ETH Zurich, he held faculty positions at the Technical University of Munich, University of Cambridge and at the Physics Department of the University of Milan. In 2015 he was elected a Fellow of Queens' College, Cambridge.

Zaccone contributed to various areas of condensed matter physics.

He is known for his work on the atomic theory of elasticity and viscoelasticity of amorphous solids, in particular for having developed the microscopic theory of elasticity of random sphere packings and elastic random networks. With Konrad Samwer he developed the Krausser–Samwer–Zaccone equation for the viscosity of liquids. With Eugene Terentjev he developed a molecular-level theory of the glass transition based on thermoelasticity, which provides the molecular-level derivation of the Flory–Fox equation for the glass transition temperature of polymers.

He is also known for having developed, in his PhD thesis, the extension of DLVO theory that describes the stability of colloidal systems in fluid dynamic conditions based on a new solution (developed using the method of matched asymptotic expansions) to the Smoluchowski convection–diffusion equation. The predictions of the theory have been extensively verified experimentally by various research groups. Also in his PhD thesis, he developed a formula for the shear modulus of colloidal nanomaterials, which has been confirmed experimentally in great detail. In 2020 he discovered and mathematically predicted that the low-frequency shear modulus of confined liquids scales with inverse cubic power of the confinement size.

In 2017 he was listed as one of the 37 most influential researchers worldwide (with less than 10–12 years of independent career) by the journal Industrial & Engineering Chemistry Research published by the American Chemical Society. In 2020 he was listed among the Emerging Leaders by the Journal of Physics published by the Institute of Physics.

As of October 2023, he has published well over 150 articles in peer-reviewed journals, h-index=40.

In 2021 he led a team that theoretically predicted and computationally discovered well-defined topological defects as mediators of plasticity in amorphous solids. This discovery has been later successfully confirmed independently by a research group led by Wei-Hua Wang and Walter Kob.

In January 2022 he proposed an approximate solution for the random close packing problem in 2D and 3D, which received multiple comments online.

In May 2026 he showed that a simple nonlinear differential equation mathematically can describe key dynamics of global population growth over the past 12000 years, which also includes the exploration of future scenarios. According to the worst-case scenario described in the paper, the global human population could halve by 2064

== Awards and honors ==
- 2010 – Alexander von Humboldt Fellowship
- 2011 – Oppenheimer Fellowship at Cavendish
- 2011 – ETH Medal Award
- 2014 – Swiss National Science Foundation Professorship
- 2015 – Fellowship of Queens' College, Cambridge
- 2015 – Mößbauer-Professur of the Technical University of Munich
- 2017 – Industrial & Engineering Chemistry Research Class of 2017 Influential Researcher
- 2020 – Gauß-Professur of the Göttingen Academy of Sciences and Humanities
- 2020 – Journal of Physics: Materials Emerging Leader

== Selected publications ==
- Gu, S.; Wunder, S.; Lu, Y.; Ballauff, M.; Fenger, R.; Rademann, K.; Jaquet, B.; Zaccone, A. (2014), "Kinetic Analysis of the Catalytic Reduction of 4-Nitrophenol by Metallic Nanoparticles", Journal of Physical Chemistry C, 118 (32): 18618–18625, doi:10.1021/jp5060606.
- Zaccone, A.; Scossa-Romano, E. (2011), "Approximate analytical description of the nonaffine response of amorphous solids.", Physical Review B, 83 (18) 184205, arXiv:1102.0162, Bibcode:2011PhRvB..83r4205Z, doi:10.1103/PhysRevB.83.184205, S2CID 119256092.
- Zaccone, A.; Terentjev, E. (2013), "Disorder-Assisted Melting and the Glass Transition in Amorphous Solids.", Physical Review Letters, 110 (17) 178002, arXiv:1212.2020, Bibcode:2013PhRvL.110q8002Z, doi:10.1103/PhysRevLett.110.178002, PMID 23679782, S2CID 15600577.
- Krausser, J.; Samwer, K. H.; Zaccone, A. (2015), "Interatomic repulsion softness directly controls the fragility of supercooled metallic melts.", Proceedings of the National Academy of Sciences of the USA, 112 (45): 13762–7, arXiv:1510.08117, Bibcode:2015PNAS..11213762K, doi:10.1073/pnas.1503741112, PMC 4653154, PMID 26504208.
