= Rigidity theory (physics) =

In physics, rigidity theory, or topological constraint theory, is a tool for predicting properties of complex networks (such as glasses) based on their composition. It was introduced by James Charles Phillips and refined by Michael Thorpe.

This theory reduces complex molecular networks to nodes (atoms, molecules, proteins, etc.) constrained by rods (chemical constraints), thus filtering out microscopic details that ultimately don't affect macroscopic properties.

Rigidity theory applied to the molecular networks arising from phenotypical expression of certain diseases may provide insights regarding their structure and function.

== History ==
Inspired by the study of the stability of mechanical trusses as pioneered by James Clerk Maxwell in 1864, and by the seminal work on glass structure done by William Houlder Zachariasen in 1932, James Charles Phillips introduced rigidity theory in 1979 and 1981, and it was later refined by Michael Thorpe in 1983.

An equivalent theory was developed by P. K. Gupta and A. R. Cooper in 1990, where rather than nodes representing atoms, they represented unit polytopes. An example of this would be the SiO tetrahedra in pure glassy silica. This style of analysis has applications in biology and chemistry, such as understanding adaptability in protein-protein interaction networks.

In molecular networks, atoms can be constrained by radial 2-body bond-stretching constraints, which keep interatomic distances fixed, and angular 3-body bond-bending constraints, which keep angles fixed around their average values. As stated by Maxwell's criterion, a mechanical truss is isostatic when the number of constraints equals the number of degrees of freedom of the nodes. In this case, the truss is optimally constrained, being rigid but free of stress. This criterion has been applied by Phillips to molecular networks, which are called flexible, stressed-rigid or isostatic when the number of constraints per atoms is respectively lower, higher or equal to 3, the number of degrees of freedom per atom in a three-dimensional system. The same condition applies to random packing of spheres, which are isostatic at the jamming point. Typically, the conditions for glass formation will be optimal if the network is isostatic, which is for example the case for pure silica. Flexible systems show internal degrees of freedom, called floppy modes, whereas stressed-rigid ones are complexity locked by the high number of constraints and tend to crystallize instead of forming glass during a quick quenching.

== Derivation of isostatic condition ==
The conditions for isostaticity can be derived by looking at the internal degrees of freedom of a general 3D network. For $N$ nodes, $N_c$ constraints, and $M_{eq}$ equations of equilibrium, the number of degrees of freedom is

$$F=3N-N_c-M_{eq}$$

The node term picks up a factor of 3 due to there being translational degrees of freedom in the x, y, and z directions. By similar reasoning, $M_{eq}=6$ in 3D, as there is one equation of equilibrium for translational and rotational modes in each dimension. This yields

$$F=3N-N_c-6$$

This can be applied to each node in the system by normalizing by the number of nodes

$$f=3-n_c$$

where $f=\frac{F}{N}$, $n_c=\frac{N_c}{N}$, and the last term has been dropped since for atomistic systems $6\ll N$. Isostatic conditions are achieved when $f=0$, yielding the number of constraints per atom in the isostatic condition of $n_c=3$.

An alternative derivation is based on analyzing the shear modulus $G$ of the 3D network or solid structure. The isostatic condition, which represents the limit of mechanical stability, is equivalent to setting $G =0$ in a microscopic theory of elasticity that provides $G$ as a function of the internal coordination number of nodes and of the number of degrees of freedom. The problem has been solved by Alessio Zaccone and E. Scossa-Romano in 2011, who derived the analytical formula for the shear modulus of a 3D network of central-force springs (bond-stretching constraints): $G=(1/30)\kappa R_{0}^{2}(z-2d)$. Here, $\kappa$ is the spring constant, $R_{0}$ is the distance between two nearest-neighbor nodes, $z$ the average coordination number of the network (note that here $z N/ 2 \equiv N_c$ and $z/2 \equiv n_c$), and $2d = 6$ in 3D. A similar formula has been derived for 2D networks where the prefactor is $1/18$ instead of $1/30$. Hence, based on the Zaccone–Scossa-Romano expression for $G$, upon setting $G= 0$, one obtains $z= 2d =6$, or equivalently in different notation, $n_c = 3$, which defines the Maxwell isostatic condition. A similar analysis can be done for 3D networks with bond-bending interactions (on top of bond-stretching), which leads to the isostatic condition $z= 2.4$, with a lower threshold due to the angular constraints imposed by bond-bending.

== Developments in glass science ==
Rigidity theory allows the prediction of optimal isostatic compositions, as well as the composition dependence of glass properties, by a simple enumeration of constraints. These glass properties include, but are not limited to, elastic modulus, shear modulus, bulk modulus, density, Poisson's ratio, coefficient of thermal expansion, hardness, and toughness. In some systems, due to the difficulty of directly enumerating constraints by hand and knowing all system information a priori, the theory is often employed in conjunction with computational methods in materials science such as molecular dynamics (MD). Notably, the theory played a major role in the development of Gorilla Glass 3. Extended to glasses at finite temperature and finite pressure, rigidity theory has been used to predict glass transition temperature, viscosity and mechanical properties. It was also applied to granular materials and proteins.

In the context of soft glasses, rigidity theory has been used by Alessio Zaccone and Eugene Terentjev to predict the glass transition temperature of polymers and to provide a molecular-level derivation and interpretation of the Flory–Fox equation. The Zaccone–Terentjev theory also provides an expression for the shear modulus of glassy polymers as a function of temperature which is in quantitative agreement with experimental data, and is able to describe the many orders of magnitude drop of the shear modulus upon approaching the glass transition from below.

In 2001, Boolchand and coworkers found that the isostatic compositions in glassy alloys—predicted by rigidity theory—exist not just at a single threshold composition; rather, in many systems it spans a small, well-defined range of compositions intermediate to the flexible (under-constrained) and stressed-rigid (over-constrained) domains. This window of optimally constrained glasses is thus referred to as the intermediate phase or the reversibility window, as the glass formation is supposed to be reversible, with minimal hysteresis, inside the window. Its existence has been attributed to the glassy network consisting almost exclusively of a varying population of isostatic molecular structures. The existence of the intermediate phase remains a controversial, but stimulating topic in glass science.
