= Punit Boolchand =

American academic

- Education: Case Western Reserve
- Known for: Gorilla Glass; Theory of Network Glasses
- Scientific career
- Fields: Solid State Physics, Materials Science
- Workplaces: University of Cincinnati

Punit Boolchand is a materials scientist, a professor in the Department of Electrical Engineering and Computing Systems (EECS) in the College of Engineering and Applied Science (CEAS) at the University of Cincinnati (UC), where he is director of the Solid State Physics and Electronic Materials Laboratory He discovered the Intermediate Phase: an elastically percolative network glass distinguished from traditional (clustered) liquid–gas spinodals by strong non-local long-range interactions. The IP characterizes space-filling, nearly stress-free and non-aging, critically self-organized non-equilibrium glassy networks (such as window glass, ineluctably complex high-temperature superconductors, microelectronic Si/SiO_{2} high-κ dielectric interfaces, and protein folding). His experimental data over a 25-year period (1982–2007) formed the basis for the theory of network glasses developed by James Charles Phillips and Michael Thorpe. The theory was adopted by Corning Inc. and was a substantial factor contributing to the development of Gorilla glass by Corning scientists including John C. Mauro. These networks, although disordered, exhibit many nearly ideal properties that have revolutionized glass science and technology, as part of HD TV and glass covers for devices such as cell phones.

== Biography ==
Boolchand was born in 1944, in Varanasi, in Uttar Pradesh, in Northern India. He completed his schooling at The Scindia School in 1961. He moved to the US in the Fall of 1965, becoming a graduate student at Case Western Reserve, Cleveland, OH, receiving his PhD in the Fall of 1969. He then joined University of Cincinnati as an assistant professor in the Physics Dept, moving to the Dept of Electrical and Computer Engineering (ECE) in 1987; when the Computer Science Dept was merged into ECE it became EECS.

He also spent time as a visiting scientist at Stanford University and as a visiting professor at the University of Leuven, Belgium. He was elected a Fellow of the American Physical Society in 1995 for Mossbauer studies of chalcogenide glasses that elucidate coordination, cluster formation, and incipient phase separation. He was nominated by the Division of Condensed Matter Physics.

== Publications ==
He has published 45 papers which have received more than 100 citations each. His most cited papers are

- Xingwei Feng, W. J. Bresser, and P. Boolchand "Direct Evidence for Stiffness Threshold in Chalcogenide Glasses" Physical Review Letters volume 78, number 23 (June 7, 1977), Which has received 440 references according to Google Scholar
- P. Boolchand, D.G. Georgiev " Discovery of the intermediate phase in chalcogenide glasses" Journal of Optoelectronics and Advanced Material, Volume 3, Issue 3, p. 703–720 Sept 2001(paper received the Boris T. Kolomiets Award). Sept 2001, which has received 371 citations
