= J. C. Phillips =

J. C. Phillips may refer to:

- John Calhoun Phillips (1870–1943), Arizona politician, 3rd Governor of Arizona
- James Charles Phillips (b. 1933), American physicist
