= Leslie Bates =

Leslie Bates may refer to:

- Leslie Fleetwood Bates (1897–1978), English physicist
- Leslie Bates (actor) (?–2014, fl. 1960–1978) see Marco Polo (Doctor Who)
