= G. Srinivasan =

G. Srinivasan may refer to:

- G. Srinivasan (actor), Indian film actor, writer and director
- G. Srinivasan (physicist) (born 1942), Indian physicist
- Gomathi Srinivasan, Indian politician
