= Rigidity theory =

Rigidity theory may refer to

- Study of the concept of rigidity (mathematics)
- Mathematical theory of structural rigidity
- Rigidity theory (physics), or topological constraints theory, describes or predicts the mechanical properties of glass
