= Morrel H. Cohen =

American theoretical condensed matter physicist

- Born: 1927 (age 98–99)
- Education: University of California
- Scientific career
- Fields: Condensed matter physics; Biology
- Workplaces: University of Chicago; ExxonMobil
- Thesis: On nuclear electric quadrupole interactions in crystals. (1952)
- Doctoral advisor: Charles Kittel
- Doctoral students: Ganesan Srinivasan

Morrel H. Cohen (born 1927) is an American theoretical physicist of condensed matter. He was a Professor of Physics at the University of Chicago from 1952 to 1981, and was appointed Louis Block Professor of Physics and Biology in 1972. He worked at the Exxon Research and Engineering Company from 1981 until 1996, and then served in an emeritus role there until 2000. He currently has post-retirement positions at Rutgers University and at the Chemistry and Chemical Biology Department of Princeton University. He has published over 280 peer reviewed documents and has over 24,000 citations, according to Scopus.

== Biography ==
Morrel H. Cohen was born in the United States in 1927; his family resided in Massachusetts. Cohen received his high school diploma from the Boston Latin School in 1944. He received his B.S. from Worcester Polytechnic Institute, Worcester, Massachusetts in 1947; his M.A. from Dartmouth College, Hanover, New Hampshire, in 1948; and his Ph.D. in physics from the University of California, Berkeley, in 1952. Cohen’s Ph.D. thesis advisor was Charles Kittel. Cohen thesis was "On Nuclear Electric Quadrupole Interactions in Crystals".

Cohen joined the University of Chicago as an instructor in 1952, achieved full Professor of Physics in 1960, and was appointed Louis Block Professor of Physics and Biology in 1972. In 1978, he was elected to the National Academy of Sciences. He continued at the university until 1981, when he took a position as Senior Scientist at Exxon Research and Engineering Company in New Jersey. During his time at Chicago, he consulted with industry, including with the General Electric Company, Argonne National Laboratory, Energy Conversion Devices, Monsanto Company, Union Carbide Company, and Schlumberger Limited. During his career at Chicago and Exxon, he had sabbatical appointments at Cambridge University (1957–1958 and 1972–1973), the University of Rome (1964–1965), Kyoto University (1979), the University of Amsterdam (1991–1992), and the Scottish Universities Physics Alliance (2007).

Cohen retired from Exxon in 1996, serving as Emeritus Senior Scientist until 2000. He then took post-retirement positions in the Physics and Astronomy Department of Rutgers University and the Chemistry and Chemical Biology Department of Princeton University.

== Scientific research and contributions ==
Cohen’s primary research field is theoretical condensed matter physics, with a focus on superconductivity. Cohen has four patents. Seven of his publications have over 1,000 citations each, according to Google Scholar.

- "Quadrupole Effects in Nuclear Magnetic Resonance Studies of Solids" (M.H. Cohen, F. Reif), Solid State Physics 5, 321 (1957). doi:10.1016/S0081-1947(08)60105-8
- "Self-Consistent Field Approach to the Many Electron Problem" (H. Ehrenreich, M.H. Cohen), Phys. Rev. 115, 786 (1959). doi:10.1103/PhysRev.115.786
- "Molecular Transport in Liquids and Glasses" (M.H. Cohen, D. Turnbull), J. Chem. Phys. 31, 1164 (1959). doi:10.1063/1.1730566
- "A Free Volume Model of the Amorphous Phase: The Glass Transition" (D. Turnbull, M.H. Cohen), J. Chem. Phys. 34, 120 (1961). doi:10.1063/1.1731549
- "Simple Band Model for Amorphous Semiconducting Alloys" (M.H. Cohen, H. Fritzsche, S.R. Ovshinsky), Phys. Rev. Letts. 22, 1065 (1969). doi:10.1103/PhysRevLett.22.1065
- "Liquid-Glass Transition, A Free-Volume Approach" (M.H. Cohen, G.S. Grest), Phys. Rev. B 20, 1077 (1979). doi:10.1103/PhysRevB.20.1077
- "A Self-Similar Model for Sedimentary Rocks with Application to the Dielectric Constant of Fused Glass Beads", (P.N. Sen, C. Scala), Geophysics 46, 781 (1981). doi:10.1190/1.1441215

In 1962, Cohen, Falicov, and Phillips calculated the tunneling current between normal and superconducting metals across a barrier. This confirmed a prediction Brian Josephson had made about the current between two superconducting metals, taking Josephson a step along his path towards his Nobel prize.

Cohen was a mentor to Marvin L. Cohen, who called him "an impressive mentor". Cohen was thesis advisor to Eleftherios Economou.

In addition to his research in condensed matter physics, Cohen published research in the application of statistical physics to the fields of biology and econophysics.

Cohen also contributed to the history of physics, writing memoirs of his interactions with Elihu Abrahams, Enrico Fermi, and David Turnbull, coauthoring with Marvin L. Cohen an obituary for Charles Kittel, and giving an oral history interview to the American Institute of Physics in 1981.

== Selected honors and appointments ==
- Fellow, John Simon Guggenheim Memorial Foundation (1957–1958)
- Member, Advisory Panel on Electrophysics, National Aeronautics and Space Administration (1962–1966)
- Acting Director, James Franck Institute, University of Chicago (1965–1966)
- Director, James Franck Institute, University of Chicago (1968–1971)
- Doctor of Science (honorary), Worcester Polytechnic Institute (1973)
- Director, National Science Foundation (NSF) Materials Research Laboratory, University of Chicago (1977–1981)
- Member, National Academy of Sciences (1978)
- Fellow, American Association for the Advancement of Science (1995)
