= McEuen =

McEuen is a surname. Notable people with the surname include:

- John McEuen (born 1945), American folk musician
- Paul McEuen (born 1963), American physicist
- William E. McEuen (1941–2020), film producer and record producer
