= RKKY interaction =

Physical interaction between magnetic moments

The RKKY interaction is a long-range interaction between magnetic moments in a metal. The energy oscillates with distance, decaying as $r^{-3}$. The oscillations are caused by the interaction of the magnetic moments with the conduction electrons in the metal.

A schematic diagram of 4 electrons scattered by 4 magnetic atoms far apart. Each atom is at the center of decaying electron waves. The electrons mediate the interactions among the atoms, whose poles can flip because of the influence of other atoms and the surrounding electrons. Reproduced from and.

In the physical theory of spin glass magnetization, the Ruderman–Kittel–Kasuya–Yosida (RKKY) interaction models the coupling of nuclear magnetic moments or localized inner d- or f-shell electron spins through conduction electrons. It is named after Malvin Ruderman, Charles Kittel, Tadao Kasuya, and Kei Yosida, the physicists who first proposed and developed the model.

Malvin Ruderman and Charles Kittel of the University of California, Berkeley first proposed the model to explain unusually broad nuclear spin resonance lines in natural metallic silver. The theory is an indirect exchange coupling: the hyperfine interaction couples the nuclear spin of one atom to a conduction electron also coupled to the spin of a different nucleus. The assumption of hyperfine interaction turns out to be unnecessary, and can be replaced equally well with the exchange interaction.

The simplest treatment assumes a Bloch wavefunction basis and therefore only applies to crystalline systems; the resulting correlation energy, computed with perturbation theory, takes the following form:
$$H(\mathbf{R}_{ij}) = \frac{\mathbf{I}_i \cdot \mathbf{I}_j}{4} \frac{\left| \Delta_{k_m k_m} \right|^2 m^*}{(2 \pi )^3 R_{ij}^4 \hbar^2} \left[ 2 k_m R_{ij} \cos( 2 k_m R_{ij} ) - \sin( 2 k_m R_{ij} ) \right]\text{,}$$
where H represents the Hamiltonian, R_{ij} is the distance between the nuclei i and j, I_{i} is the nuclear spin of atom i, Δ_{k_{m}k_{m}} is a matrix element that represents the strength of the hyperfine interaction, m^{*} is the effective mass of the electrons in the crystal, and k_{m} is the Fermi momentum. Intuitively, we may picture this as when one magnetic atom scatters an electron wave, which then scatters off another magnetic atom many atoms away, thus coupling the two atoms' spins.

Tadao Kasuya from Nagoya University later proposed that a similar indirect exchange coupling could occur with localized inner d-electron spins instead of nuclei. This theory was expanded more completely by Kei Yosida of UC Berkeley, to give a Hamiltonian that describes (d-electron spin)–(d-electron spin), (nuclear spin)–(nuclear spin), and (d-electron spin)–(nuclear spin) interactions. J.H. Van Vleck clarified some subtleties of the theory, particularly the relationship between the first- and second-order perturbative contributions.

Perhaps the most significant application of the RKKY theory has been to the theory of giant magnetoresistance (GMR). GMR was discovered when the coupling between thin layers of magnetic materials separated by a non-magnetic spacer material was found to oscillate between ferromagnetic and antiferromagnetic as a function of the distance between the layers. This ferromagnetic/antiferromagnetic oscillation is one prediction of the RKKY theory.
