= Greg Sheridan =

Australian journalist and author (born 1956)

Greg Sheridan AO
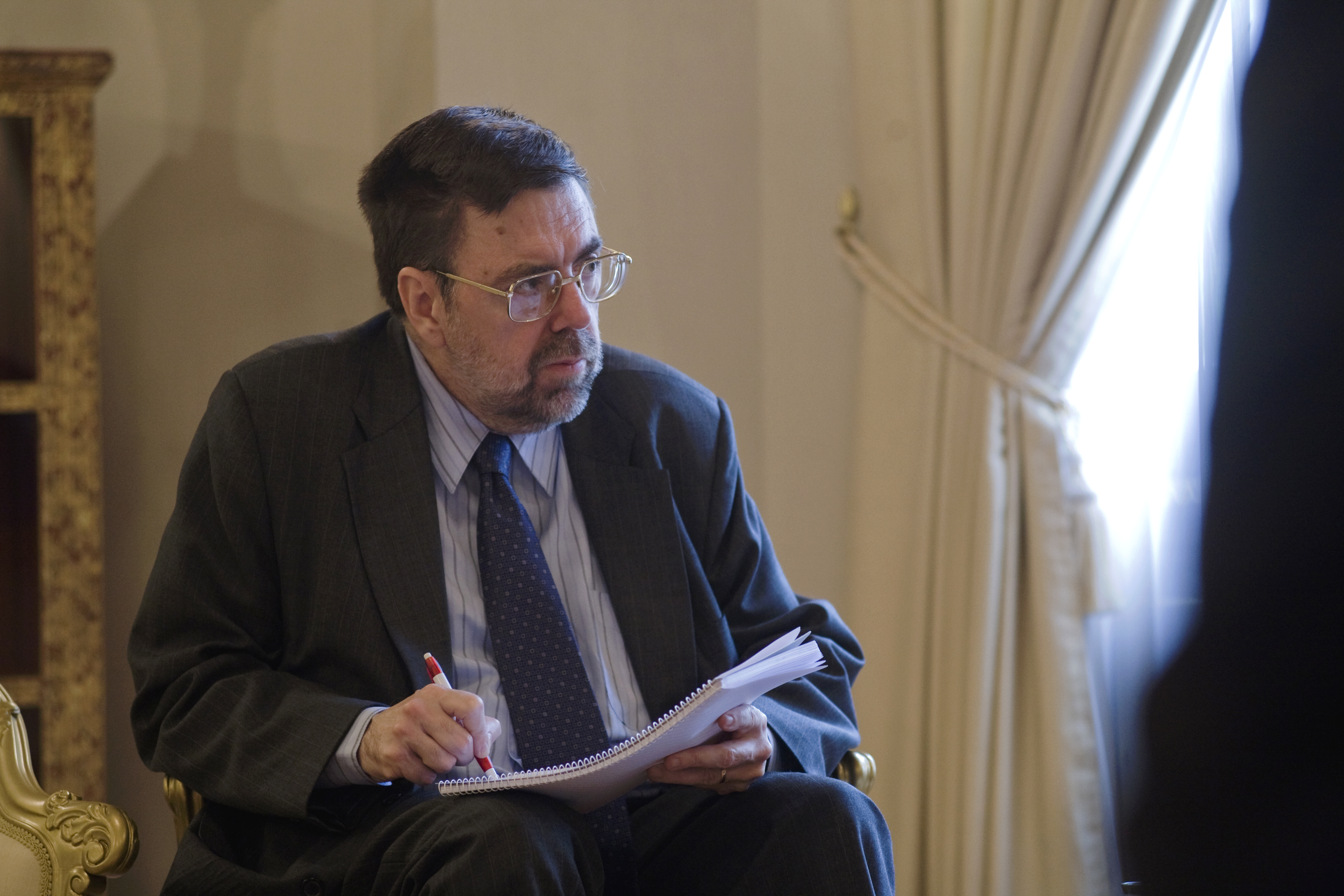
- Sheridan interviewing the Thai Prime Minister Abhisit Vejjajiva, June 2010
- Born: 22 November 1956 (age 69); Inner West Sydney
- Occupation: Journalist
- Spouse: Jessie
- Website: Greg Sheridan, profile at The Australian

Gregory Paul Sheridan AO (born 1956) is an Australian foreign affairs journalist, author and commentator. He has written a number of books on politics, religion and international affairs and has been the foreign editor of The Australian newspaper since 1992. He is a regular commentator on Australian television and radio, including for the ABC and Sky News Australia.

== Early life and education ==
Sheridan was born in Sydney in 1956 and grew up in a lower middle class Irish-Catholic family. They lived in a two bedroom flat in the western Sydney suburb of Lewisham, where he attended Christian Brothers' High School. The family later moved to Forestville on Sydney's North Shore. At 15, Greg convinced his parents to allow him to go to the Redemptorist seminary at Galong in southern New South Wales to train as a priest; however, he only lasted a year at the institution and completed his high schooling at the Christian Brothers school St Pius X College at Chatswood in Sydney. According to friend and academic Karl Schmude, Sheridan's early family life and university experiences gave him a grounding in politics, which steered him towards journalism.

In a review of Sheridan's 2015 book God Is Good for You, author Gerard Henderson wrote that "Bob (BAS) Santamaria was one of young Greg's early heroes. Along with United States president J F Kennedy. In 1963, he became interested in politics. Every Sunday, the family tuned into BAS's Point of View commentary program on Channel 9. And 1963 was the year of the Kennedy assassination. Half a century later, Sheridan's politics have not changed much. Like Kennedy and Santamaria, he is an anti-communist and a social democrat. Sheridan is also a social conservative and was slow to embrace free market economics."

He sporadically attended Macquarie University and the University of Sydney over several years, but never graduated, finding it difficult to deal with lecturers with whom he disagreed. While pursuing his university education, he became involved in student politics. During this time, he befriended the future Liberal prime minister Tony Abbott. Sheridan and Abbott involved themselves in the opposition to the left-wing university politics of the 1970s, usually through involvement in the campus Democratic Club, which received support from Santamaria's National Civic Council. Sheridan also served for a time as senior vice-president of the Sydney University Liberal Club, supporting Abbott standing for the students' representative council.

Sheridan's 2015 book When We Were Young & Foolish covers his university politics years. According to the book, his journalistic career began after he attended the Australian Union of Students (AUS) annual conference in Melbourne in 1977 with Tony Abbott. Of the experience, he wrote: "Everything about the conference, and about AUS and student politics in those days, was undemocratic and full of intimidation ... All the violence in student politics, all of it, came from the left." He recounted leftist and anarchist attacks on Michael Danby and Peter Costello and Tony Abbott, and wrote that, after Abbott and the female member of their group were assaulted by leftists during the AUS conference, Sheridan and Abbott sought counsel from the influential lay Catholic Bob Santamaria for the first time. After the conference, Sheridan wrote an article about the violence which was published in The Bulletin: "Whatever merit or otherwise my journalistic career may have had over the next 40 years, perhaps I owe it all to AUS", he wrote in When We Were Young & Foolish. Sheridan later wrote some articles on the sciences academic conflict at Macquarie University.

After leaving university, Sheridan became an industrial organiser for a trade union and joined the Australian Labor Party.

== Career ==
Sheridan was drawn to being a writer during his Sydney University years, at which time he had several articles published in The Bulletin magazine and elsewhere. He later said that he was drawn to journalism by "a love of words and language, a love of controversy and intellectual debate, a desire to 'use my gunpowder' and make a difference."

George Orwell and Malcolm Muggeridge inspired me as journalists. And of course Chesterton. One book took me to Asia. Christopher Koch's Year of Living Dangerously, his magnificent novel of Australian journalists in Sukarno's Jakarta. And, oddly enough, a [Vincent] Cronin's biography of Matteo Ricci, the Jesuit who was one of the first Westerners in China.

His career in journalism began at The Bulletin in the late 1970s. Covering the story of Vietnamese refugees after the Vietnam War sparked an interest in Asian and regional politics. Sheridan later wrote of his time at The Bulletin: "It was astonishing good fortune for me to know all these people at The Bulletin. Trevor Kennedy, Bob Carr, Alan Reid, Sam Lipski, Malcolm Turnbull and the rest. It was a scintillating magazine under Trevor Kennedy's editorship."

Sheridan joined the staff of The Australian and in 1985 became that newspaper's first China correspondent. He later worked in Washington and Canberra before returning to Sydney as the newspaper's foreign editor in 1992. He specialises in Asian and U.S. politics for The Australian and has interviewed presidents and prime ministers around the world.

He is a distinguished fellow of the Australia India Institute at the University of Melbourne.

Since 2017, Sheridan has published books and articles on Christianity, beginning with an article in The Australian entitled "Is God dead?", subtitled "The West has much to lose by banishing Christianity". Sheridan told the Catholic Herald that the article "got the biggest readership of any article in the history of the paper since they've been able to measure these things". The following year, he published the book God Is Good for You: A Defence of Christianity in Troubled Times, which argued that "God is true", and discusses the faith of high profile Australian politicians including Malcolm Turnbull, Tony Abbott, John Howard, Kevin Rudd, Kim Beazley, Peter Costello, Kristina Keneally, Penny Wong, and Bill Shorten. The book became a bestseller. His book How Christians Can Succeed Today (2025) describes in part one the struggle and success of the early Christians and in part two describes the journey of some modern Christians.

== Personal life ==
Sheridan is a Catholic, and has written two books on Christianity. According to Karl Schmude writing for Quadrant, "Sheridan is more than a cultural Catholic. He actually believes; and he is deeply conscious of the springs of conviction that lie beneath a higher faith." He is married to Jasbir Kaur "Jessie" Sheridan, who practises the Sikh religion along with their three sons. He moved to Melbourne in 2006.

== Honours, reviews and recognition ==
Sheridan was given an Officer of the Order of Australia Honour in 2016, with the citation, "For distinguished service to print media as a journalist and political commentator on foreign affairs and national security, and to Australia's bilateral relationships".

His profile on the Australian Broadcasting Corporation's Q+A program describes him as "one of Australia's most respected and influential analysts of domestic and international politics. He has written several books on Asia and Australia's role in the region. He is also a keen observer of US international affairs and is on close terms with senior figures in Washington, London and other major foreign capitals."

Britain's Catholic Herald has described Sheridan as "a subtle thinker, a keen observer of the cultural climate and an engaging writer.

== Commentary ==
Sheridan has written extensively on Australian, Asian and international politics, and is a regular commentator on Australian TV and radio.

=== Whitlam Government ===
Sheridan has written that the Whitlam Labor Government (1972-1975) was "overall perhaps the worst government in Australian history", with government expenditure running "wildly out of control".

=== Fraser Government ===
Sheridan's career in journalism began during the Fraser government years. Sheridan was later critical of what he alleged was Malcolm Fraser's political transformation to the left after leaving office, his embrace of anti-Americanism and what Sheridan describes as the "myth-making of the legions of new admirers Fraser gained when he abruptly shifted from being a rightwinger to being a leftwinger." When Fraser died in 2015, Sheridan offered this general assessment:

Fraser's achievements in government were substantial. He ended the shambles and crisis that the Whitlam government, overall perhaps the worst government in Australian history, had produced. He brought macro-economic stability back to Australia. He seriously curtailed the growth of government expenditure, which had run wildly out of control under Whitlam. And he brought inflation back to reasonable levels. He made some progress in lowering some tariffs. He instituted the Campbell inquiry, which laid out the path of financial reform, although he was too timid to follow this path and its implementation was largely left to the Hawke government.

=== Hawke Government ===
Following the death of Fraser's successor Bob Hawke in 2019, Sheridan wrote that "In foreign affairs and national security, Bob Hawke was a magnificently successful prime minister. He wasn't perfect. He made mistakes. But the ledger is vastly in the black, hugely positive ... As a social democrat, [Hawke] hated dictatorship and knew that in the Cold War he was on the side of the US-led alliance of which Australia was an integral part."

=== Other issues ===
Sheridan has been a supporter of closer ties between Australia and its Southeast Asian neighbours, particularly Malaysia, Thailand, and Indonesia.

In his 1998 book Hidden Agendas, John Pilger criticised Sheridan for being a "reliable ally" of Indonesia's Suharto dictatorship while serving as the foreign editor of The Australian. In particular, Pilger derided Sheridan's defence of Indonesia after the critique of Suharto's human rights records by the Clinton administration and the Australian Parliament's Foreign Affairs Committee, following the Santa Cruz Massacre in East Timor. Sheridan said that "even genuine victims frequently concoct stories."

In 2006, Sheridan called for the removal by Australia of Mari Alkatiri as Prime Minister of East Timor.

He wrote in 2006 that "George W. Bush may well be judged, ultimately, a great president, especially in foreign policy, especially in the war on terror. This consensus won't form for 20 or perhaps 30 years."

Prior to the 2016 US presidential election, Sheridan repeatedly predicted that Hillary Clinton would beat Trump.

In June 2020 during the George Floyd protests, Sheridan commented on Sky News Australia that the Floyd murder was a one-off and there was no systemic racism in US. "Most African Americans are middle class, and they don't suffer daily, shocking racism", Sheridan said. "I myself have lived in the United States on four separate occasions. And I never saw any racial confrontation. I never heard anyone make a racist remark. The very fact that America is convulsed over this shocking incident shows that it is not an America in which racial violence against blacks is normalised or accepted, you know, carried out by official agencies or by private private individuals."

=== ABC bias ===
Sheridan is a regular panellist on ABC television and radio, however he has at times criticised the national broadcaster for bias. Sheridan was highly critical of what he saw as the ABC's antagonistic reporting of the case against Catholic Cardinal George Pell, who was acquitted by the full bench of the High Court of Australia in April 2020. Sheridan wrote for The Australian: "the ABC has become a relentless behemoth of unaccountable and vindictive power that persecutes designated enemies in a grievously unfair and unprofessional way. Its campaigns against its enemies have a whiff of the Red Guards in China's Cultural Revolution." Sheridan also criticised Victorian Labor Premier Dan Andrews for refusing to accept the High Court verdict, writing that he saw the Premier's comments as the "most irresponsible remarks made by a modern premier. In more than 40 years of journalism, I can recall no premier making remarks that could be interpreted as challenging the High Court in a criminal matter". Sheridan called columnist Andrew Bolt "the bravest man in Australia" for speaking out against the wrongful conviction of the Cardinal for sex abuse.

== Assessments ==
Reviewing Sheridan's book Christians: The Urgent Case for Jesus in Our World on Crikey, Guy Rundle wrote that Sheridan "spent years in the early 2000s spruiking for one war after the next" and "if Sheridan’s faith was of a real depth and ground, he wouldn’t have needed the black mass he helped plunge the Middle East into by his relentless cheerleading".

In 2019 Sheridan visited Poland and Hungary, paid for by the Polish government and a Hungarian conservative think-tank, the Mathias Corvinus Collegium. Reviewing Sheridan's defence of Viktor Orban and citing his praise of Tony Abbott, Narendra Modi and George W Bush, Myriam Robin wrote in the Australian Financial Review that "Sheridan spends his impassioned writing life hyperbolising one cult of personality to the next". After his trip, Sheridan wrote articles praising the Polish and Hungarian governments and rejected depictions of Hungarian Prime Minister Viktor Orbán as a fascist.

== Books ==
- (editor and co-author) Living with Dragons: Australia Confronts Its Asian Destiny (Allen & Unwin, 1995; ISBN 1-86373-880-0)
- Tigers: Leaders of the New Asia-Pacific (Allen & Unwin, 1997; ISBN 1-86448-153-6)
- Asian Values, Western Dreams: Understanding the New Asia (Allen & Unwin, 1999; ISBN 1-86448-496-9)
- Cities of the Hot Zone: A Southeast Asian Adventure (Allen & Unwin, 2003; ISBN 1-74114-224-5)
- The Partnership: The Inside Story of the US-Australian Alliance Under Howard and Bush (UNSW Press, 2006; ISBN 0-86840-922-7)
- When We Were Young & Foolish: A Memoir of My Misguided Youth with Tony Abbott, Bob Carr, Malcolm Turnbull, Kevin Rudd & Other Reprobates (Allen & Unwin, 2015; ISBN 9-78176-0113-391)
- God Is Good for You: A Defence of Christianity in Troubled Times (Allen & Unwin, 2018; ISBN 9-78176-0632-601)
- Christians: The Urgent Case for Jesus in Our World] (Allen & Unwin, 2021, ISBN 9781760879099)
- How Christians Can Succeed Today. Allen & Unwin. 2 September 2025. ISBN 9781761471124.
