= Paul McEuen =

American physicist

- Born: 1963 (age 62–63); Oklahoma, United States
- Education: Oklahoma, Yale
- Known for: Carbon nanotube research
- Scientific career
- Fields: Nanotechnology
- Workplaces: Cornell University

Paul McEuen (born 1963) is an American physicist. He received his B.S. in engineering physics at the University of Oklahoma (1985), and his Ph.D. in applied physics at Yale University (1991). After postdoctoral work at MIT (1990–1991), he became an assistant professor at the University of California, Berkeley. He moved to Cornell University in 2001, where he is currently the emeritus John A. Newman Professor of Physical Science. He is an expert on the electrical properties of carbon nanotubes and is a member of the National Academy of Sciences.

== Research focus ==
Paul McEuen studies the electrical and mechanical properties of carbon nanotubes, scanning probe microscopy of nanostructures, molecular electronics, and applications of nanoelectronics in chemistry and biology. His group publishes their work frequently in Nature and Science, and McEuen has an h-index of 90.

== Novel ==
McEuen wrote a scientific thriller, Spiral (released in 2011), in which an emeritus Cornell biology professor is murdered as part of a plot involving a biological weapon, which received positive reviews by the New York Times and the Los Angeles Times. The German translation became available on October 29, 2010. McEuen sold the movie rights for "Spiral" to Chockstone Pictures.

== Positions ==
- John A. Newman (formerly Goldwin Smith) Professor of Physics, Cornell University, (2008–present)
- Professor, physics, Cornell University, (2001–present)
- Associate professor, Physics, University of California, Berkeley (1996-2000)
- Assistant professor, Physics, University of California, Berkeley (1992-1996)
- Postdoctoral researcher, MIT (1990-1991)

== Awards and fellowships ==
- National Academy of Sciences (2011)
- American Physical Society Fellow (2003)
- Agilent Technologies Europhysics Prize (2001)
- Packard Foundation Interdisciplinary Fellow (1999)
- LBNL Outstanding Performance Award (1997)
- National Young Investigator (1993-1998)
- Packard Foundation Fellow (1992-1997)
- Alfred P. Sloan Foundation Fellow (1992-1994)
- Office of Naval Research Young Investigator (1992-1995)

== Other contributions ==
- McEuen has written Chapter 18, Nanostructures of Kittel's famous textbook Introduction to Solid State Physics (8ed).
- McEuen, along with others, helped uncover the Schön scandal.
