= Flory–Fox equation =

Equation in polymer science

In polymer chemistry and polymer physics, the Flory–Fox equation is a simple empirical formula that relates molecular weight to the glass transition temperature of a polymer system. The equation was first proposed in 1950 by Paul J. Flory and Thomas G. Fox while at Cornell University. Their work on the subject overturned the previously held theory that the glass transition temperature was the temperature at which viscosity reached a maximum. Instead, they demonstrated that the glass transition temperature is the temperature at which the free space available for molecular motions achieved a minimum value. While its accuracy is usually limited to samples of narrow range molecular weight distributions, it serves as a good starting point for more complex structure-property relationships.

Recent molecular simulations have demonstrated that while the functional form of the Flory-Fox relation holds for a wide range of molecular architectures (linear chain, bottlebrush, star, and ring polymers), however, the central free-volume argument of the Flory-Fox relation does not hold since branched polymers, despite having more free ends, form materials of higher density and glass transition temperature increases.

== Overview ==
The Flory–Fox equation relates the number-average molecular weight, M_{n}, to the glass transition temperature, T_{g}, as shown below:

$$T_{g} = T_{g,\infty}-\frac{K}{M_{n}}$$

where T_{g,∞} is the maximum glass transition temperature that can be achieved at a theoretical infinite molecular weight and K is an empirical parameter that is related to the free volume present in the polymer sample. It is this concept of "free volume" that is observed by the Flory–Fox equation.

Free volume can be most easily understood as a polymer chain's "elbow room" in relation to the other polymer chains surrounding it. The more elbow room a chain has, the easier it is for the chain to move and achieve different physical conformations. Free volume decreases upon cooling from the rubbery state until the glass transition temperature at which point it reaches some critical minimum value and molecular rearrangement is effectively "frozen" out, so the polymer chains lack sufficient free volume to achieve different physical conformations. This ability to achieve different physical conformations is called segmental mobility.

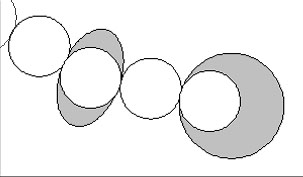
A polymer chain (represented by the white circles) exhibits more free volume (represented by the gray shading) at the ends of the chain than from units within the chain.

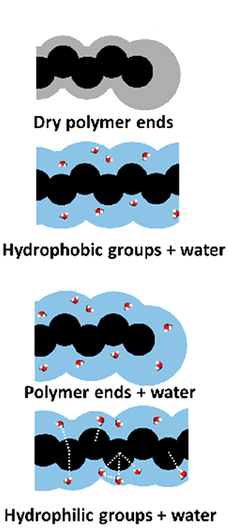
Distribution of the associated free volume along polymer chain in the presence of plasticizer as shown by recent molecular simulation study.

Free volume not only depends on temperature, but also on the number of polymer chain ends present in the system. End chain units exhibit greater free volume than units within the chain because the covalent bonds that make up the polymer are shorter than the intermolecular nearest neighbor distances found at the end of the chain. In other words, chain end units are less dense than the covalently bonded interchain units. This means that a polymer sample with low polydispersity and long chain lengths (high molecular weights) will have fewer chain ends per total units and less free volume than an equivalent polymer sample consisting of short chains. In short, chain ends can be viewed as an "impurity" when considering the packing of chains, and more impurity results in a lower T_{g}. A recent study that utilized computer simulations showed that the classical picture of mobility around polymer chain can differ in the presence of plasticizer, especially if molecules of plasticizer can create hydrogen bonds with specific sites of the polymer chain, such as hydrophilic or hydrophobic groups. In such a case, polymer chain ends exhibit only a mere increase of the associated free volume as compared to the average associated free volume around main chain monomers. In special cases, the free volume around hydrophilic main chain sites can exceed the free volume associated to the hydrophilic polymer ends.

Thus, glass transition temperature is dependent on free volume, which in turn is dependent on the average molecular weight of the polymer sample. This relationship is described by the Flory–Fox equation. Low molecular weight values result in lower glass transition temperatures whereas increasing values of molecular weight result in an asymptotic approach of the glass transition temperature to T_{g,∞} .

=== Molecular-level derivation ===
The main shortcoming related to the free volume concept is that it is not so well defined at the molecular level. A more precise, molecular-level derivation of the Flory–Fox equation has been developed by Alessio Zaccone and Eugene Terentjev. The derivation is based on a molecular-level model of the temperature-dependent shear modulus G of glassy polymers. The shear modulus of glasses has two main contributions, one which is related to affine displacements of the monomers in response to the macroscopic strain, which is proportional to the local bonding environment and also to the non-covalent van der Waals-type interactions, and a negative contribution that corresponds to random (nonaffine) monomer-level displacements due to the local disorder. Due to thermal expansion, the first (affine) term decreases abruptly near the glass transition temperature T_{g} because of the weakening of the non-covalent interactions, while the negative nonaffine term is less affected by temperature. Experimentally, it is observed indeed that G drops sharply by many orders of magnitude at or near T_{g} (it does not really drop to zero but to the much lower value of the rubber elasticity plateau). By setting $G(T_g) = 0$ at the point where the G drops abruptly and solving for T_{g}, one obtains the following relation:

$${T_g} = \frac{1}{\alpha _T}(1 - C - \phi _c^* + 2\Lambda)
- \frac{{2\Lambda M_0}}{\alpha _T M_n}$$

In this equation, $\phi_c^*$ is the maximum volume fraction, or packing fraction, occupied by the monomers at the glass transition if there were no covalent bonds, i.e. in the limit of average number of covalent bonds per monomer $z_{\rm co}=0$. If the monomers can be approximated as soft spheres, then $\phi_c^*\approx 0.64$ as in the jamming of soft frictionless spheres. In the presence of covalent bonds between monomers, as is the case in the polymer, the packing fraction is lowered, hence $\phi _c = \phi _c^* - \Lambda \cdot {z_{\rm co}}$, where $\Lambda$ is a parameter that expresses the effect of topological constraints due to covalent bonds on the total packing fraction occupied by the monomers in a given polymer. Finally, the packing fraction occupied by the monomers in the absence of covalent bonds is related to $T_g$ via thermal expansion, according to $\phi_c = \exp (-\alpha_T T_g -C)$, which comes from integrating the thermodynamic relation between thermal expansion coefficient $\alpha_{T}$ and volume V, $\alpha_T = \frac{1}{V}\,\left(\partial V/\partial T\right)$, where $\alpha_T$ is the coefficient of thermal expansion of the polymer in the glassy state. Note the relation between packing fraction $\phi$ and total volume given by $\phi=v N/V$, where $N$ is the total number of monomers, with molecular volume $v$, contained in the total volume $V$ of the material, which has been used above. Hence $C$ is the integration constant in $\ln(1/\phi)=\alpha_{T}T+C$, and it was found that $C\approx0.48$ for the case of polystyrene. Also, $M_0$ is the molecular weight of one monomer in the polymer chain.

Hence the above equation clearly recovers the Flory–Fox equation with its dependence on the number average molecular weight $M_n$, and provides a molecular-level meaning to the empirical parameters present in the Fox-Flory equation. Furthermore, it predicts that $T_g \sim 1/\alpha_{T}$, i.e. that the glass transition temperature is inversely proportional to the thermal expansion coefficient in the glass state.

=== Alternative equations ===
While the Flory–Fox equation describes many polymers very well, it is more reliable for large values of M_{n} and samples of narrow weight distribution. As a result, other equations have been proposed to provide better accuracy for certain polymers. For example:

$$T_{g} = T_{g,\infty}-\frac{K}{(M_{n}M_{w})^\frac{1}{2}}.$$

This minor modification of the Flory–Fox equation, proposed by Ogawa, replaces the inverse dependence on M_{n} with the square root of the product of the number-average molecular weight, M_{n} , and weight-average molecular weight, M_{w} . Additionally, the equation:

$$\frac{1}{T_{g}} = \frac{1}{T_{g,\infty}}+\frac{K}{T_{g,\infty}^2}\frac{1}{M_{n}}$$

was proposed by Fox and Loshaek, and has been applied to polystyrene, polymethylmethacrylate, and polyisobutylene, among others.

Despite the dependence of T_{g} on molecular weight that the Flory-Fox and related equations describe, molecular weight is not necessarily a practical design parameter for controlling T_{g} because the range over which it can be changed without altering the physical properties of the polymer due to molecular weight change is small.

== Fox equation ==
The Flory–Fox equation serves the purpose of providing a model for how glass transition temperature changes over a given molecular weight range. Another method to modify the glass transition temperature is to add a small amount of low molecular weight diluent, commonly known as a plasticizer, to the polymer. The presence of a low molecular weight additive increases the free volume of the system and subsequently lowers T_{g} , thus allowing for rubbery properties at lower temperatures. This effect is described by the Fox equation:

$$\frac{1}{T_{g}} = \frac{w_{1}}{T_{g,1}}+\frac{w_{2}}{T_{g,2}}.$$

Where w_{1} and w_{2} are weight fractions of components 1 and 2, respectively. In general, the accuracy of the Fox equation is very good and it is commonly also applied to predict the glass transition temperature in (miscible) polymer blends and statistical copolymers.
