= Macquarie science reform movement =

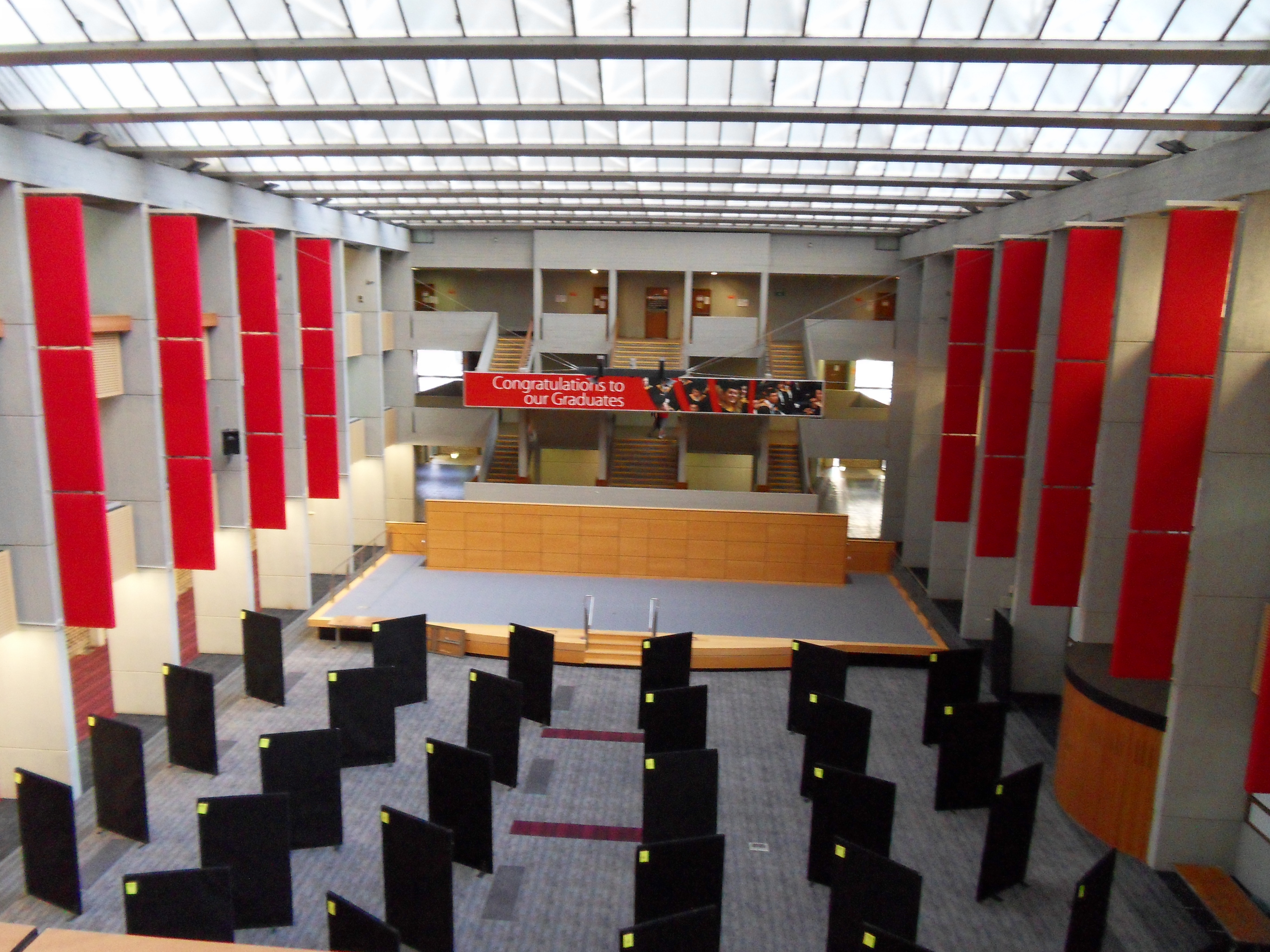
The E7B Building Courtyard, now known as the Frederick Chong Courtyard, where the Macquarie science reform movement began. This building used to be the home of the school of Mathematics and Physics.

Macquarie science reform movement refers to the successful transformation of the degree system at Macquarie University in 1979 which followed an academic and political campaign initiated in 1977.

Macquarie University, founded in 1964, adopted a degree structure modeled after the Oxbridge tradition where all graduating students were awarded a BA regardless of their field of study, with the exception of law students.

Many science students saw this as a disadvantage and began to mobilize for reform of the degree structure. Thus, in 1977 a student organization, known as Students for a Science Degree (SSD), was formed with physicist Frank Duarte as chairman. SSD enlisted the support of science students, student politicians, science academics, and professional science institutions.

Among the senior science professors that openly supported the SSD led reform movement were Ronald E. Aitchison (Electronics), Frederick Chong (Mathematics), Brian F. Gray (Chemistry), John G. Hawke (Chemistry), Richard E. B. Makinson (Physics), Ronald H. Vernon (Geophysics), and John C. Ward (Physics). Support was particularly strong at the former school of Mathematics and Physics.

The BSc campaign lasted almost two years, and most of it is documented in the Arena student newspaper. In 1977 a front page newspaper article read: "A student revolt is underway at Macquarie University against an outmoded degree system." The campaign wound down only when the Academic Senate of Macquarie University approved, almost unanimously, a science degree (BSc) on 11 September 1979.

A perspective on the science reform movement is given in the book Liberality of Opportunity which was co-authored by Bruce Mansfield, a former professor of history and Deputy Vice-Chancellor of the University. In this account it is subtly implied that the reform movement might have been under the tutelage of J. C. Ward: "Ward was vocal in his denunciation of the trivia that filled up Senate agendas… suitably then, it was a close student associate of Ward’s, physics PhD student Frank Duarte, who began to mobilize student opinion in favor of a change." This suggestion of influence is not corroborated in any of the numerous contemporaneous articles on the subject. Besides, Ward’s own description of events states that: "there arose quite spontaneously from the students themselves a demand that they be allowed to graduate as Bachelor of Science." His account gives no hints of tutelage, or influence, on the student leadership, when "the sciences revolted."

In 1980, Greg Sheridan described the duel between the sciences and the Macquarie establishment as a "nasty, bitter bureaucratic struggle" won by the reformers and their allies.

Back to the present: Macquarie University offers about ninety (90) named undergraduate degrees in addition to the original BSc introduced in 1979.
