= Wei-Hua Wang =

Chinese physicist

Wei-Hua Wang (Chinese: 汪卫华) is a Chinese physicist.

Wang completed a doctorate in solid state physics at the Institute of Physics, Chinese Academy of Sciences in July 1993. He subsequently became a visiting scientist at the University of Göttingen between August 1994 and July 1995, then pursued postdoctoral study at the Hahn-Meitner-Institut from August 1995 to July 1997. In August 1997, Wang returned to IOPCAS. In 2013, Wang was elected a fellow of the American Physical Society, recognized "[f]or significant contributions to the understanding of the physical properties of metallic glasses, in particular, the development of the microscopic mechanisms of metallic glass formation and their mechanical properties."
