= Kenneth Standley =

Scottish physicist

Prof Kenneth Jack Standley FRSE FIP FPS (c.1920–2002) was a 20th-century Scottish physicist.

== Life ==
In 1941 he was commissioned into the Royal Army Ordnance Corps during the Second World War.

He completed his studies in Physics at Oxford University graduating MA then gaining a postgraduate doctorate (PhD).

He became Professor of Physics at Dundee University in 1965.

In 1967 he was elected a Fellow of the Royal Society of Edinburgh. His proposers for the latter were George Dawson Preston, Arthur Walsh, Ernest Geoffrey Cullwick, and John F. Allen. He served as the Society's vice president from 1973 to 1976.

He died on 6 June 2002.

== Publications ==
- Electron Spin Relaxation Phenomena in Solids
- Oxide Magnetic Materials
