= Ganesan Srinivasan =

Indian physicist

G. Srinivasan
- Born: 9 April 1942 (age 84); Madurai
- Education: Nagpur University; University of Madras; University of Chicago
- Scientific career
- Fields: Astrophysics condensed matter
- Workplaces: University of Chicago; IBM Research Laboratory; Chalmers University of Technology; Cavendish Laboratory; Raman Research Institute; ISRO; Indian Institute of Astrophysics
- Thesis: (1970)
- Doctoral advisor: Morrel H. Cohen

Ganesan Srinivasan (born 1942) is an Indian physicist specializing in the fields of condensed matter physics, astrophysics and statistical physics. He is a visiting professor of the Indian Institute of Astrophysics and a former research scientist in the Raman Research Institute. He is also a current member of the High Energy Phenomena and Fundamental Physics and the Galaxies and Cosmology Divisions of the IAU.

== Biography ==
Srinivasan was born in Madurai, Tamil Nadu, in 1942. He finished his bachelor's degree from Nagpur University in 1962 and the master's degree from University of Madras in 1964. He completed his PhD from University of Chicago in 1970 under the supervision of Morrel H. Cohen. After working in various research institutes including Cavendish Laboratory at the University of Cambridge, he finally settled into the Raman Research Institute in 1976, until his retirement in 2004.

== Books and publications ==
- G. Srinivasan (2011). Can Stars Find Peace? (Present Revolution in Astronomy). Universities Press. ISBN 978-8173717420.
- G. Srinivasan (2011). What are the Stars? (The Present Revolution in Astronomy Series). Universities Press. ISBN 978-8173717413.
- G. Srinivasan (Eds.) (1999). From White Dwarfs to Black Holes: The Legacy of S. Chandrasekhar. University of Chicago Press. ISBN 9780226769974.
- G. Srinivasan (Eds.) (1996). A tribute to Subrahmanyan Chandrasekhar. A special publication of the Indian Academy of Sciences. Indian Academy of Sciences.
- G. Srinivasan (Eds.) (1995). Pulsars: Proceedings of the Diamond Jubilee Symposium of the Indian Academy of Sciences. Indian Academy of Sciences.
- G. Srinivasan, V. Radhakrishnan (Eds.) (1985). Supernovae, Their Progenitors and Remnants: Proceedings of the Academy Workshsop. Indian Academy of Sciences.
- G. Srinivasan (Eds.) (2014). Life and Death of the Stars. Universities Press, Springer Science and Business Media.
- Lecture series on neutron stars and black holes (14 videos) in Emmy Noether Seminar Room, ICTS Bangalore, 2019

== Honors ==
Srinivasan is an elected fellow of the Indian Academy of Sciences from 1984. He is also the recipient of K. S. Krishnan Gold Medal, Jagirdar of Arni Gold medal and University of Madras PE Subramani Iyer Gold Medal. The Journal of Astrophysics and Astronomy published a special issue on Srinivasan's 70th birthday. He is also the President of the Astronomical Society of India.
