= Leslie Fleetwood Bates =

English physicist (1897-1978)

Leslie Fleetwood Bates, CBE, FRS (7 March 1897 – 20 January 1978) was an English physicist known for his contributions to ferromagnetism. He was Lancashire-Spencer Professor of Physics at the University of Nottingham from 1936 until his retirement in 1964.

== Early life, undergraduate studies and the War ==
Born on 7 March 1897 in Kingswood, Bristol, Bates was the eldest son of William Fleetwood Bates, originally from Bletchley, Buckinghamshire, who worked as a clerk in a boot manufacturing company, and his wife, Henrietta Anne, née Pearce, from Kingswood, Bristol. Despite being raised an Anglican, he decided to attend the Moravian Church from the age of 7. He attended Hanham Road Boys' School until 1909, when he started at the Merchant Venturers' Secondary School with the aid of a bursary and scholarship. In 1913, he won a City of Bristol Scholarship to study physics at the University of Bristol; he was influenced by his father's pacifism and did not enlist to fight in World War I, focusing instead on his studies; he earned a pass Bachelor of Science degree (BSc) in physics and mathematics in 1916. He then joined the Royal Army Medical Corps as a radiographer and was commissioned with the rank of Lieutenant (eventually attaining Captain), serving in India until 1920. On demobilisation, he applied to study medicine at Bristol, but was turned down. Instead, he worked there as a student demonstrator for two years, mostly measuring the gyromagnetic ratio with A. P. Chattock and W. Sucksmith, which sparked an interest in ferromagnetism.

== Academic career and public service ==
Bates was awarded a studentship by the Department of Scientific and Industrial Research to study for a doctorate (PhD) at Trinity College, Cambridge; under Sir Ernest Rutherford, he measured long alpha particle emissions of radium, thorium, actinium and polonium, but did not especially enjoy the work. In 1924, he was appointed an Assistant Lecturer in Physics at University College London; four years later he was promoted to Lecturer 1928, the year after Senior Lecturer and Reader in 1930. In 1936, Bates was appointed Lancashire-Spencer Professor of Physics at the University College of Nottingham (the University of Nottingham from 1948). He held the position until retirement in 1964. Bates's work focused on ferromagnetism. In 1949 he was awarded the Fernand Holweck Medal and Prize. He was Nottingham University College's Vice-Principal from 1944 to 1946 and was President of the Physical Society (1950–52).

During World War II, he was a consultant to the Inter-Services Research Bureau (1941–45), and between 1951 and 1972 he was Senior Scientific Adviser for Civil Defence, North Midland Region. He was appointed a Fellow of the Royal Society in 1950 and a Commander of the Order of the British Empire in 1966, and received honorary Doctor of Science degrees from the Universities of Nottingham (1972) and Durham (1975).

== Personal life ==
In 1925, Bates married Winifred Frances Furze Ridler (died 1965), the only daughter of F. Ridler, of Bristol; they had one son and one daughter: Roger Fleetwood Bates (born 1929), a schoolmaster, and Elizabeth Susan Bates (married name Lautch; born 1933), who became a doctor. Leslie Fleetwood Bates died on 20 January 1978, aged 81.
