= Charles Kittel =

American physicist (1916–2019)

- Born: July 18, 1916; New York City, New York, U.S.
- Died: May 15, 2019 (aged 102); Berkeley, California, U.S.
- Education: St John's College, Cambridge (BA); University of Wisconsin–Madison (PhD)
- Known for: RKKY interaction; Introduction to Solid State Physics
- Spouse: Muriel A. Lister
- Children: 3
- Awards: Oliver E. Buckley Condensed Matter Prize (1957); Oersted Medal (1979)
- Scientific career
- Fields: Physics
- Institutions: Massachusetts Institute of Technology; Bell Laboratories; University of California, Berkeley
- Thesis: The fine structure of nuclear energy levels on the alpha model (1941)
- Doctoral advisor: Gregory Breit
- Doctoral students: Albert Overhauser; Morrel H. Cohen; George Feher; Elihu Abrahams; Raymond L. Orbach

Charles Kittel (July 18, 1916 – May 15, 2019) was an American physicist. He was a professor at the University of California, Berkeley from 1951 and was professor emeritus from 1978 until his death. He is known for co-introducing the Ruderman–Kittel–Kasuya–Yosida interaction models and for his famous textbook Introduction to Solid State Physics.

== Early life and education ==
Charles Kittel was born in New York City in 1916. He attended the Horace Mann School for Boys, graduating in June 1934. Kittel then entered the Massachusetts Institute of Technology as a chemistry major before switching to physics. He transferred to the St John's College, Cambridge two years later, where he obtained a bachelor of arts in 1938.

Kittel began his graduate studies at the University of Wisconsin–Madison the same year and obtained his Doctor of Philosophy degree in 1941, with a thesis supervised by Gregory Breit.

== Career ==
During World War II, he joined the Submarine Operations Research Group (SORG). (He is mentioned on page 478 of RV Jones' book Most Secret War, published 1978.) He served in the United States Navy as a naval attache.

Kittel joined MIT again in 1945, this time as a research associate, remaining there until 1947. From 1947 to 1951, he worked for Bell Laboratories, New Jersey, USA, especially on ferromagnetism.

From 1951 to 1978, he worked at the University of California, Berkeley, where he taught and did research in the field of theoretical solid-state physics, a part of condensed-matter physics. He was awarded a Guggenheim Fellowship in 1945, 1956 and 1963. Many well-known postdoctoral fellows worked with him, including James C. Phillips and Pierre-Gilles de Gennes.

Among other achievements, Kittel is credited with the theoretical discovery of the RKKY interaction (the first K standing for Kittel) and the Kittel magnon mode in ferromagnets.

Physics students worldwide study his classic text Introduction to Solid State Physics, now in its 8th edition.

== Personal life ==
Kittel married Muriel A. Lister, at the time an English literature student, in 1938 during his time at Cambridge. The two had three kids: Peter, Ruth and Timothy. Lister, who went on to have a career as a scholarly translator, died in 2009 at the age of 93.

Kittel died on May 15, 2019, at his home in Berkeley. He was 102.

== Honors and awards ==
- Oliver E. Buckley Condensed Matter Prize, 1957
- Berkeley Distinguished Teacher Award, 1970
- Oersted Medal, American Association of Physics Teachers, 1979

Kittel was a member of the U.S. National Academy of Sciences, elected in 1957.

== Works ==
- 1953: Introduction to Solid State Physics, 8th edition 2005, ISBN 0-471-41526-X
- 1958: Elementary Statistical Physics. New York: John Wiley & Sons. OCLC 912372820. Reprinted five times by 1967; a reproduction was published in 2004 by Dover ISBN 9780486435145
- 1963: Quantum Theory of Solids ISBN 0-471-49025-3, 1987 (with C. Y. Fong) ISBN 0-471-62412-8
- 1965: (with Walter D. Knight and Malvin A. Ruderman) Mechanics, volume 1 of Berkeley Physics Course
- 1969: Thermal Physics, 2nd ed. 1980 (with Herbert Kroemer) ISBN 0-7167-1088-9

== See also ==
- Antiferroelectricity
- Ferromagnetic resonance
- Single domain (magnetic)
