= James Charles Phillips =

American physicist

James Charles Phillips (born March 9, 1933) is an American physicist and a member of the National Academy of Sciences (1978). He invented the exact theory of the ionicity of chemical bonding in semiconductors, as well as new theories of compacted networks (including glasses, high temperature superconductors, and proteins). He is known for having developed the rigidity theory to study glass alloys and later protein evolution.

== Biography ==
Phillips spent postdoctoral years at University of California, Berkeley with Charles Kittel, and at the Cavendish lab., Cambridge University, where he introduced pseudopotential ideas that were used there for decades by Volker Heine and others. He returned to the University of Chicago as a faculty member (1960–1968). There, he and Marvin L. Cohen extended pseudopotential theory to calculate the fundamental optical and photoemission spectra of many semiconductors, with high precision.

Phillips returned to full-time research at Bell Laboratories (1968–2001), where he completed his dielectric studies of semiconductor properties. In 1979, he invented a practical theory of compacted networks, known as rigidity theory, specifically applied first to network glasses, based on topological principles and Lagrangian bonding constraints (1100+ citations). Over time, this theory organized large quantities of glass data, and culminated in the 1999 discovery 1999 by Punit Boolchand of a new phase of matter – the intermediate phase of glasses, free of internal stress, and with a nearly reversible glass transition. This theory has been adopted at Corning, where it has contributed to the invention of new specialty glasses, including Gorilla glass (used in over three billion portable devices in 2014) and others.

In 2001, Phillips moved to Rutgers University, where he completed his 1987 theory of high temperature superconductors as self-organized percolative dopant networks, by displaying their high T_{c} systematics in a unique Pauling valence compositional plot with a symmetric cusp-like feature, entirely unlike that known for the critical temperatures T_{c} of any other phase transition.

Next, he found a way to connect Per Bak's ideas of self-organized criticality to proteins, which are networks compacted into globules by hydropathic forces, by using a new hydrophobicity scale (similar in precision to his dielectric scale of ionicity) invented in Brazil using bioinformatic methods on more than 5000 structures in the Protein Data Bank.

Phillips has since applied his bioinformatic scaling methods to several medically important families.

In 2020, Phillips contributed a manuscript to the Proceedings of the National Academy of Sciences concluding that the evolution of human dynein shows features "indicative of intelligent design". An accompanying letter did not support this controversial conclusion: "Invoking intelligent design in an attempt to buttress unjustified generalizations on evolution is non sequitur writ large". The work was continued to discuss the evolution of Coronavirus (CoV) from 2003 to 2019. It identified a new set of "level" spike mutations suggested to explain the very high contagiousness of CoV2019. The theory also predicted the very high success of the Oxford vaccine, later reported in newspapers. Finally, in late 2022, he identified a qualitative change in the set of spike mutations from becoming more level to being concentrated near a few sites in the receptor binding domain. This shift explains the abrupt end of the COVID-19 pandemic in 2023. A close collaboration with experimental work on homogenized covalent glass alloys revealed two closely parallel phase transitions in the alloys with the evolution of spike mutations.

== Publications ==
Phillips has published four books and more than 500 papers. He has patterned his work after that of Enrico Fermi and Linus Pauling; it emphasizes general new ideas in the concrete context of problem solving. One highlight is his 1994 bifurcated solution to the fractions found in stretched exponential relaxation, the oldest (~ 140 years) unsolved problem in science. This controversial topological model was confirmed in a decisive experiment by Corning, with their best glasses in specially tailored geometries (2011). His bifurcation theory also explains (2010, 2012) the distributions of 600 million citations from 25 million papers (all of 20th-century science), and why they changed abruptly in 1960.
