= Michael Thorpe =

American scientist

- Born: March 12, 1944 (age 82)
- Education: University of Manchester (B.A.); Oxford University (PhD)
- Known for: Glassy Network; Flexibility; Rigidity
- Awards: D.Sc., Oxford University, 1993 Distinguished Faculty Award, Michigan State University, 1989; Fellow of American Physical Society; Fellow of the British Institute of Physics; Member of the European Physical Society Member of Sigma Xi and AAAS
- Scientific career
- Fields: Condensed Matter; Materials Science; Biophysics
- Workplaces: Yale University; Michigan State University; Arizona State University
- Website: http://thorpe2.la.asu.edu/thorpe/

Michael Thorpe (born March 12, 1944) is an English-American physicist and Foundation Professor of Physics at Arizona State University. He received his D. Phil from Oxford University in 1968 in condensed matter physics under supervision of Sir Roger James Elliott. His early research was on network glasses, but has recently focused on applying his knowledge to the study of protein dynamics.

In 2003, Thorpe joined Arizona State University from Michigan State University. His research interests are in the theory of disordered systems, with a special emphasis on properties that are determined by geometry and topology. He has a research background in condensed matter theory, and in recent years has developed the mathematical theory of flexibility and mobility for use in network glasses.

== Birth and education ==
Thorpe attended Manchester University in 1962 and received his B.Sc. with first Class Honours in Theoretical Physics in 1965. After conducting research in theoretical solid state physics (1965–1968), he received his D. Phil from Department of Theoretical Physics at Oxford University. He was a research associate at Brookhaven National Laboratory from 1968 to 1970.

He joined Department of Engineering & Applied Science at Yale University as an assistant professor in 1970, where he became an associate professor from 1974 to 1977. He was an associate professor (1976–1980), professor (1980–1996) and university distinguished professor (1997–2003) at Physics & Astronomy Department in Michigan State University.

In 2003, Thorpe joined Arizona State University as foundation professor and later became the founding director of the Center for Biological Physics.

== Research ==
Thorpe's work has connected two fundamental subjects in the topology and properties of compacted networks. His work on network glasses demonstrated that their quenched character can be described quantitatively in terms of their internal stress, a nonlocal quantity whose reduction optimizes glass properties. His early work laid some of the foundations for Corning's revolutionary Gorilla glass, the first qualitative improvement in glass in more than a century. His most recent work has been in biological physics. The flexible regions in proteins and protein complexes are determined from the x-ray structure as determined crystallographically. These are used to determine dynamical pathways between different protein conformations using Monte Carlo methods. Proteins are stable enough to maintain a three-dimensional structure, but flexible enough for biological function. The aim of this research work is to find underlying principles and unifying concepts, to better understand the evolution and function of proteins and protein complexes.

== Recent publications ==
- Gohlke, Holger; Thorpe, M.F. (2006). "A Natural Coarse Graining for Simulating Large Biomolecular Motion". Biophysical Journal. 91 (6). Elsevier BV: 2115–2120. Bibcode:2006BpJ....91.2115G. doi:10.1529/biophysj.106.083568. ISSN 0006-3495. PMC 1557556. PMID 16815893.
- Sartbaeva, A.; Wells, S. A.; Thorpe, M. F.; Božin, E. S.; Billinge, S. J. L. (2006-08-07). "Geometric Simulation of Perovskite Frameworks with Jahn-Teller Distortions: Applications to the Cubic Manganites". Physical Review Letters. 97 (6) 065501. American Physical Society (APS). Bibcode:2006PhRvL..97f5501S. doi:10.1103/physrevlett.97.065501. ISSN 0031-9007. PMID 17026173.
- Wells, Stephen; Menor, Scott; Hespenheide, Brandon; Thorpe, M F (2005-11-09). "Constrained geometric simulation of diffusive motion in proteins". Physical Biology. 2 (4). IOP Publishing: S127–S136. Bibcode:2005PhBio...2S.127W. doi:10.1088/1478-3975/2/4/s07. ISSN 1478-3975. PMID 16280618. S2CID 13252043.
- Day, A. R.; Grant, A. R.; Sievers, A. J.; Thorpe, M. F. (2000-02-28). "Spectral Function of Composites from Reflectivity Measurements". Physical Review Letters. 84 (9). American Physical Society (APS): 1978–1981. Bibcode:2000PhRvL..84.1978D. doi:10.1103/physrevlett.84.1978. ISSN 0031-9007. PMID 11017675.

== Videos ==
- Simulating a mutation in a protein
