= Marvin L. Cohen =

American physicist

Marvin Lou Cohen
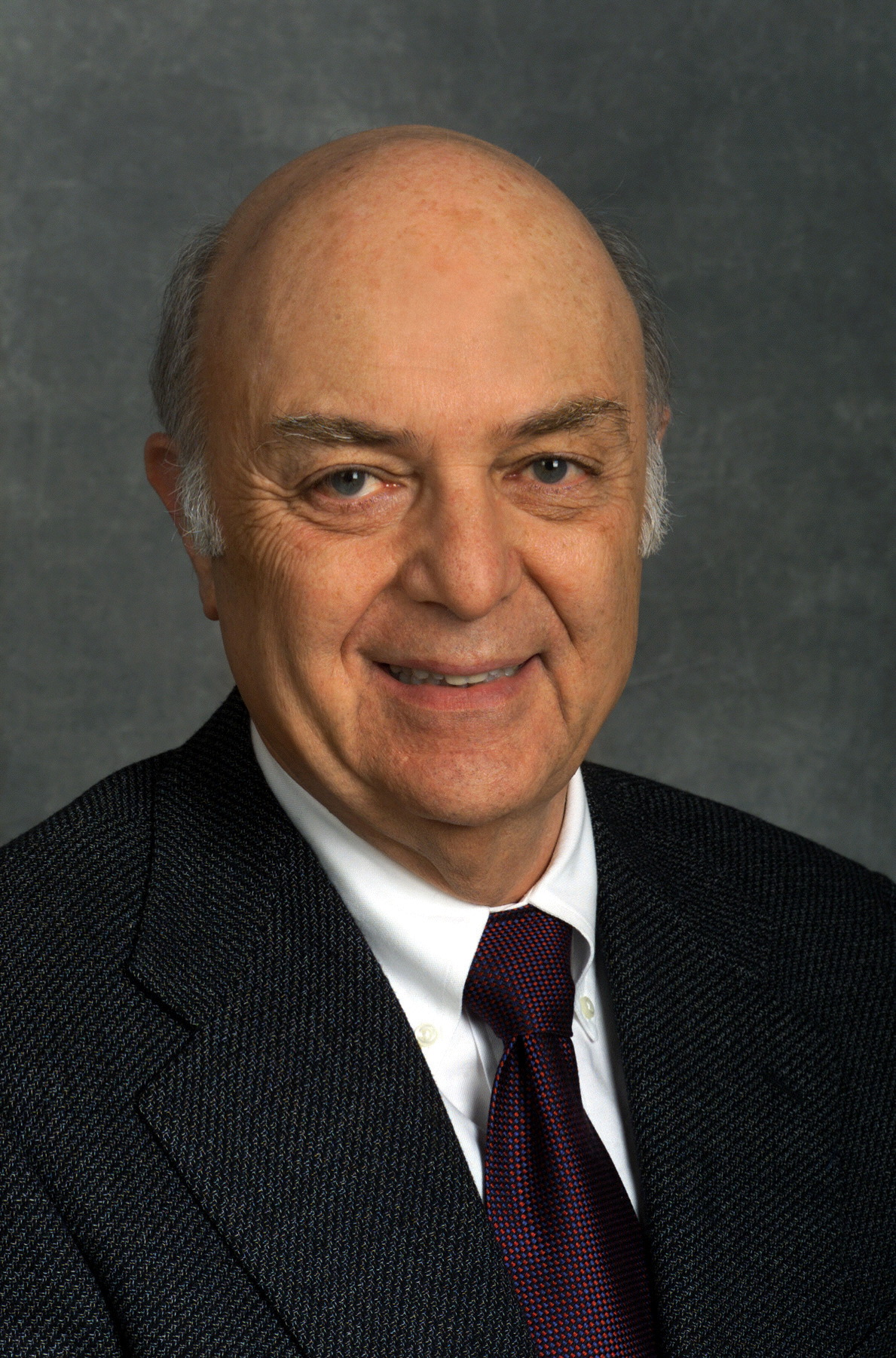
- Born: 3 March 1935 (age 91); Montreal, Canada
- Education: University of California, Berkeley; University of Chicago
- Scientific career
- Fields: Condensed matter physics
- Workplaces: University of California, Berkeley
- Doctoral advisor: James C. Phillips
- Doctoral students: John Joannopoulos; Mei-Yin Chou

Marvin Lou Cohen (born March 3, 1935) is an American–Canadian theoretical physicist. He is a physics professor at the University of California, Berkeley. Cohen is an expert in the field of condensed matter physics. He is widely known for his seminal work on the electronic structure of solids.

== Biography ==
=== Early life and education ===
Cohen was born in Montreal, Quebec, Canada. His parents Elmo and Molly (Zaritsky) Cohen were both born in Montreal and his grandparents, all of Jewish descent, emigrated to Canada from the Baltic states and Russia. He, together with his parents and younger brother, Gordon, moved to San Francisco, California, in 1947, where he attended Roosevelt Junior High School and George Washington High School. He was naturalized a U.S. citizen, November 1953.

He attended the University of California, Berkeley, for an A.B. in physics in 1957 and the University of Chicago with a M.S. in physics in 1958 and a Ph.D. in physics completed 1963, conferred 1964. His Ph.D. thesis advisor was James C. Phillips.

=== Career ===
Cohen speaks about his life and career.

From 1963 to 1964, Cohen was a member of the technical staff with a postdoctoral position in the theoretical physics group at Bell Laboratories, Murray Hill, New Jersey, where his mentors were primarily Philip W. Anderson and Conyers Herring. He joined the faculty of the University of California, Berkeley in 1964 (assistant professor of physics 1964–66; associate professor 1966–69; professor 1969–1995; university professor 1995–present; professor of the graduate school, 2010–present.) He supervised approximately fifty graduate students and fifty postdoctoral researchers since 1964. He was president of the American Physical Society in 2005.

=== Personal life ===
Marvin Cohen is married to Suzy Locke Cohen who is an Art Advisor. Cohen and his late wife Merrill Leigh Gardner Cohen (deceased 1994) had a son and a daughter. He has three grandchildren. Cohen has played the clarinet since age 13.

== Research ==
One of the most influential and broadest advances in the study of the physics of materials in the last fifty years is the use of computational tools to explain and predict properties of materials. Marvin Cohen has been honored for his creation of physical models and computational methods and applications that made a large fraction of these advances possible. This approach is often referred to as the "Standard Model" for computing properties of solids, and this work played an important part in the creation and development of the field of computational physics. The successful predictions of new materials and material properties have led to new insights in fundamental science, the production of useful materials, and the creative manipulations of known materials. An essential and standard tool is the availability of accurate electronic band structures for materials ranging from ceramics to metals, and the models and method mentioned above have made the use of electronic band structures and related calculations ubiquitous in pure and applied condensed matter physics.

For electronic structure, in the mid 1960's it became possible to use pseudopotentials for accurately computing band structures for 14 semiconductors at a time when little was known about their electronic structure. This advance was revolutionary as it explained optical properties of semiconductors in the visible and UV range and led to the first pictures of electron density and bonds in semiconductors. These results were later confirmed experimentally. This work also led to the creation of the field of surface calculations of electronic structure using the invention of the supercell. This was followed by the development of a total energy scheme which initiated a new era of first principles predictions of structural, vibrational, and high-pressure properties of solids using only atomic numbers and atomic masses as input.

For superconductivity, there were successes in the prediction of superconductivity in doped semiconductors, the prediction of the first superconducting oxide, and the confirmation of the ab initio proposed existence of two new high-pressure phases of silicon and their properties including the successful prediction of their superconducting properties.

In the area of nanostructures, it was shown that the methods used for calculating bulk and surfaces properties were applicable for studies of nanoscale materials such as the C_{60}, carbon nanotubes, and other low dimensional structures. These studies led to the successful prediction of the existence the boron nitride nanotube and its properties. Seminal studies were done explaining and predicting properties of graphene nanoribbons and their energy gaps, and the properties of layered systems of graphene and BN sheets were calculated suggesting a path for fabrication of useful electronic materials. The first theoretical and experimental studies of the electronic and vibrational properties of one-dimensional isolated chains were done, and the underlying physics was determined for controlling the size and shape of 2D nanopores with applications for DNA sequencing, sieving, and quantum emission. Another nanoscience contribution was an important study of the physics of metallic clusters using electronic energies to explain their size abundances, referred to as "magic numbers".

The methods developed for the above studies are numerous. Some examples include the empirical pseudopotential method, ab initio pseudopotentials, supercells for surfaces and localized configurations, a method for calculating the total energy of solids, the creation of an empirical formula used to obtain the bulk moduli of many semiconductors and insulators, and the development of a method for calculating electron-phonon interactions using Wannier functions. These approaches and others first developed for this research are now used worldwide.

== Awards and honors ==
- Alfred P. Sloan Fellow, 1965–67.
- Elected Fellow of the American Physical Society (APS), 1969.
- Guggenheim Fellow, 1978–79, 1990–91.
- Oliver E. Buckley Condensed Matter Prize by the APS, 1979.
- Elected to the National Academy of Sciences, 1980.
- U.S. Department of Energy Award for Outstanding Accomplishment in Solid State Physics, 1981,1990.
- Elected to the American Academy of Arts and Sciences, 1993.
- Julius Edgar Lilienfeld Prize of the APS, 1994.
- Outstanding Performance Award, Lawrence Berkeley National Laboratory, 1995.
- Faculty Research Lecturer, University of California, Berkeley, 1996–97.
- Elected Fellow, American Association for the Advancement of Science,1997.
- 2001 National Medal of Science (Presidential award, 2002).
- Elected member, American Philosophical Society, 2003.
- Awarded (with Steven Gwon Sheng Louie) the 2003 Foresight Institute Richard P. Feynman Prize in Nanotechnology.
- Awarded Doctorat Honoris Causa, University of Montreal, 2005.
- Technology Pioneer Award from the World Economic Forum, 2007.
- Berkeley Citation, University of California, 2011.
- Dickson Prize in Science, 2012.
- Doctor of Science Honoris Causa, Hong Kong University of Science and Technology, 2013.
- Doctor of Science Honoris Causa, Weizmann Institute of Science, 2014.
- Von Hippel Award of the Materials Research Society, 2014.
- Thomson Reuters Citation Laureate, 2016.
- Benjamin Franklin Medal in Physics 2017.

== Selected publications ==
- Schooley, J. F.; Hosler, W. R.; Cohen, Marvin L. (1964-04-27). "Superconductivity in Semiconducting SrTiO_{3}". Physical Review Letters. 12 (17). American Physical Society (APS): 474–475. Bibcode:1964PhRvL..12..474S. doi:10.1103/physrevlett.12.474. ISSN 0031-9007.
- Cohen, Marvin L.; Bergstresser, T. K. (1966-01-14). "Band Structures and Pseudopotential Form Factors for Fourteen Semiconductors of the Diamond and Zinc-blende Structures". Physical Review. 141 (2). American Physical Society (APS): 789–796. Bibcode:1966PhRv..141..789C. doi:10.1103/physrev.141.789. ISSN 0031-899X.
- Walter, John P.; Cohen, Marvin L. (1971-01-04). "Electronic Charge Densities in Semiconductors". Physical Review Letters. 26 (1). American Physical Society (APS): 17–19. Bibcode:1971PhRvL..26...17W. doi:10.1103/physrevlett.26.17. ISSN 0031-9007. S2CID 120217993.
- Schlüter, M.; Chelikowsky, James R.; Louie, Steven G.; Cohen, Marvin L. (1975-06-02). "Self-Consistent Pseudopotential Calculations on Si(111) Unreconstructed and (2×1) Reconstructed Surfaces". Physical Review Letters. 34 (22). American Physical Society (APS): 1385–1388. Bibcode:1975PhRvL..34.1385S. doi:10.1103/physrevlett.34.1385. ISSN 0031-9007. S2CID 119521478.
- Cohen, Marvin L.; Schlüter, M.; Chelikowsky, James R.; Louie, Steven G. (1975-12-15). "Self-consistent pseudopotential method for localized configurations: Molecules". Physical Review B. 12 (12). American Physical Society (APS): 5575–5579. Bibcode:1975PhRvB..12.5575C. doi:10.1103/physrevb.12.5575. ISSN 0556-2805. S2CID 122907077.
- Chelikowsky, James R.; Cohen, Marvin L. (1976-07-15). "Nonlocal pseudopotential calculations for the electronic structure of eleven diamond and zinc-blende semiconductors". Physical Review B. 14 (2). American Physical Society (APS): 556–582. Bibcode:1976PhRvB..14..556C. doi:10.1103/physrevb.14.556. ISSN 0556-2805. Erratum: Chelikowsky, James R.; Cohen, Marvin L. (1984-10-15). "Erratum: Nonlocal pseudopotential calculations for the electronic structure of eleven diamond and zinc-blende semiconductors". Physical Review B. 30 (8). American Physical Society (APS): 4828. Bibcode:1984PhRvB..30.4828C. doi:10.1103/physrevb.30.4828. ISSN 0163-1829.
- Ihm, J; Zunger, A; Cohen, M L (1979-11-14). "Momentum-space formalism for the total energy of solids". Journal of Physics C: Solid State Physics. 12 (21). IOP Publishing: 4409–4422. Bibcode:1979JPhC...12.4409I. doi:10.1088/0022-3719/12/21/009. ISSN 0022-3719. Erratum: Ihm, J; Zunger, A; Cohen, M L (1980-06-10). "Momentum-space formalism for the total energy of solids". Journal of Physics C: Solid State Physics. 13 (16). IOP Publishing: 3095. doi:10.1088/0022-3719/13/16/516. ISSN 0022-3719.
- Yin, M. T.; Cohen, Marvin L. (1980-09-22). "Microscopic Theory of the Phase Transformation and Lattice Dynamics of Si". Physical Review Letters. 45 (12). American Physical Society (APS): 1004–1007. Bibcode:1980PhRvL..45.1004Y. doi:10.1103/physrevlett.45.1004. ISSN 0031-9007.
- Cohen, Marvin L (1982-01-01). "Pseudopotentials and Total Energy Calculations". Physica Scripta. T1. IOP Publishing: 5–10. Bibcode:1982PhST....1....5C. doi:10.1088/0031-8949/1982/t1/001. ISSN 0031-8949. S2CID 250745690.
- Louie, Steven G.; Froyen, Sverre; Cohen, Marvin L. (1982-08-15). "Nonlinear ionic pseudopotentials in spin-density-functional calculations". Physical Review B. 26 (4). American Physical Society (APS): 1738–1742. Bibcode:1982PhRvB..26.1738L. doi:10.1103/physrevb.26.1738. ISSN 0163-1829.
- Knight, W. D.; Clemenger, Keith; de Heer, Walt A.; Saunders, Winston A.; Chou, M. Y.; Cohen, Marvin L. (1984-06-11). "Electronic Shell Structure and Abundances of Sodium Clusters". Physical Review Letters. 52 (24). American Physical Society (APS): 2141–2143. Bibcode:1984PhRvL..52.2141K. doi:10.1103/physrevlett.52.2141. ISSN 0031-9007. Erratum: Knight, W. D.; Clemenger, Keith; de Heer, Walt A.; Saunders, Winston A.; Chou, M. Y.; Cohen, Marvin L. (1984-07-30). "Electronic Shell Structure and Abundances of Sodium Clusters". Physical Review Letters. 53 (5). American Physical Society (APS): 510. Bibcode:1984PhRvL..53..510K. doi:10.1103/physrevlett.53.510.2. ISSN 0031-9007.
- Chang, K. J.; Dacorogna, Michel M.; Cohen, Marvin L.; Mignot, J. M.; Chouteau, G.; Martinez, G. (1985-05-27). "Superconductivity in High-Pressure Metallic Phases of Si". Physical Review Letters. 54 (21). American Physical Society (APS): 2375–2378. Bibcode:1985PhRvL..54.2375C. doi:10.1103/physrevlett.54.2375. ISSN 0031-9007. PMID 10031324.
- Cohen, Marvin L. (1985-12-15). "Calculation of bulk moduli of diamond and zinc-blende solids". Physical Review B. 32 (12). American Physical Society (APS): 7988–7991. Bibcode:1985PhRvB..32.7988C. doi:10.1103/physrevb.32.7988. ISSN 0163-1829. PMID 9936971.
- Liu, Amy Y.; Cohen, Marvin L. (1989-08-25). "Prediction of New Low Compressibility Solids". Science. 245 (4920). American Association for the Advancement of Science (AAAS): 841–842. Bibcode:1989Sci...245..841L. doi:10.1126/science.245.4920.841. ISSN 0036-8075. PMID 17773359. S2CID 39596885.
- Rubio, Angel; Corkill, Jennifer L.; Cohen, Marvin L. (1994-02-15). "Theory of graphitic boron nitride nanotubes". Physical Review B. 49 (7). American Physical Society (APS): 5081–5084. Bibcode:1994PhRvB..49.5081R. doi:10.1103/physrevb.49.5081. ISSN 0163-1829. PMID 10011453.
- Son, Young-Woo; Cohen, Marvin L.; Louie, Steven G. (2006-11-16). "Half-metallic graphene nanoribbons". Nature. 444 (7117): 347–349. arXiv:cond-mat/0611600. Bibcode:2006Natur.444..347S. doi:10.1038/nature05180. ISSN 0028-0836. PMID 17108960. S2CID 52851642.
- Son, Young-Woo; Cohen, Marvin L.; Louie, Steven G. (2006-11-22). "Energy Gaps in Graphene Nanoribbons". Physical Review Letters. 97 (21) 216803. arXiv:cond-mat/0611602. Bibcode:2006PhRvL..97u6803S. doi:10.1103/physrevlett.97.216803. ISSN 0031-9007. PMID 17155765. S2CID 536865.
- Giustino, Feliciano; Cohen, Marvin L.; Louie, Steven G. (2007-10-04). "Electron-phonon interaction using Wannier functions". Physical Review B. 76 (16) 165108. American Physical Society (APS). Bibcode:2007PhRvB..76p5108G. doi:10.1103/physrevb.76.165108. ISSN 1098-0121.
- Sakai, Yuki; Saito, Susumu; Cohen, Marvin L. (2015-12-15). "First-Principles Study on Graphene/Hexagonal Boron Nitride Heterostructures". Journal of the Physical Society of Japan. 84 (12) 121002. Physical Society of Japan. Bibcode:2015JPSJ...84l1002S. doi:10.7566/jpsj.84.121002. ISSN 0031-9015.
- Pham, Thang; Oh, Sehoon; Stetz, Patrick; Onishi, Seita; Kisielowski, Christian; Cohen, Marvin L.; Zettl, Alex (2018-07-20). "Torsional instability in the single-chain limit of a transition metal trichalcogenide". Science. 361 (6399). American Association for the Advancement of Science (AAAS): 263–266. arXiv:1803.02866. Bibcode:2018Sci...361..263P. doi:10.1126/science.aat4749. ISSN 0036-8075. PMID 30026223. S2CID 49896559.
- Dogan, Mehmet; Gilbert, S. Matt; Pham, Thang; Shevitski, Brian; Ercius, Peter; Aloni, Shaul; Zettl, Alex; Cohen, Marvin L. (2020-07-13). "Electron beam-induced nanopores in Bernal-stacked hexagonal boron nitride". Applied Physics Letters. 117 (2). AIP Publishing: 023102. arXiv:2002.05795. Bibcode:2020ApPhL.117b3102D. doi:10.1063/5.0010891. ISSN 0003-6951. S2CID 211126802.

=== Selected books and book chapters ===
M. L. Cohen, "Superconductivity in low-carrier-density systems: Degenerate semiconductors," in Superconductivity, ed. R. D. Parks. New York: Marcel Dekker, Inc., 1969. p. 615.

M. L. Cohen and V. Heine, "The fitting of pseudopotentials to experimental data and their subsequent application," in Solid State Physics, Vol. 24, eds. H. Ehrenreich, F. Seitz, and D. Turnbull. New York: Academic Press, 1970. p. 37.

J. D. Joannopoulos and M. L. Cohen, "Theory of short-range order and disorder in tetrahedrally bonded semiconductors," in Solid State Physics, Vol. 31, eds. H. Ehrenreich, F. Seitz, and D. Turnbull (Academic Press, New York, 1976), p. 71.

M. L. Cohen, "Electrons at interfaces," in Advances in Electronics and Electron Physics, Vol. 51, eds. L. Marton and C. Marton. New York: Academic Press, 1980. p. 1.

M. L. Cohen and J. R. Chelikowsky, "Pseudopotentials for semiconductors," in Handbook on Semiconductors, Vol. 1, ed. W. Paul. Amsterdam: North-Holland, 1982. p. 219.

W. A. de Heer, W. D. Knight, M. Y. Chou, and M. L. Cohen, "Electronic shell structure and metal clusters," in Solid State Physics, Vol. 40, ed. H. Ehrenreich and D. Turnbull. New York: Academic Press, 1987. p. 93.

M. L. Cohen and J. R. Chelikowsky, Electronic Structure and Optical Properties of Semiconductors. Berlin: Springer-Verlag, 1988. TEXTBOOK.

M. L. Cohen, "Overview: A standard model of solids," Conceptual Foundations of Materials: A Standard Model for Ground- and Excited-State Properties, vol. eds. S. G. Louie, M. L. Cohen, (Elsevier, Amsterdam, 2006) p. 1.

M. L. Cohen, "Emergence in condensed matter physics," in Visions of Discovery: New Light on Physics, Cosmology, and Consciousness," eds. R.Y. Chiao, M. L. Cohen, A.J. Leggett, W. D. Phillips, and C.L. Harper, Jr. (Cambridge University Press, Cambridge, 2010) p. 496.

M. L. Cohen, "Predicting and explaining Tc and other properties of BCS superconductors," Modern Phys. Lett. B 24, 2755 (2010). Also in Bardeen, Cooper, and Schrieffer: 50 Years, eds. L.N. Cooper and D. Feldman (World Scientific, Singapore, 2010).

M. L. Cohen and S. G. Louie, Fundamentals of Condensed Matter Physics. Cambridge: Cambridge University Press, 2016. TEXTBOOK. M. L. Cohen, " Modeling solids and its impact on science and technology," Handbook of Materials Modeling, eds. W. Andreoni and S. Yip (Springer, Cham, Switzerland, 2018), p. 1.
