= Eugene Terentjev =

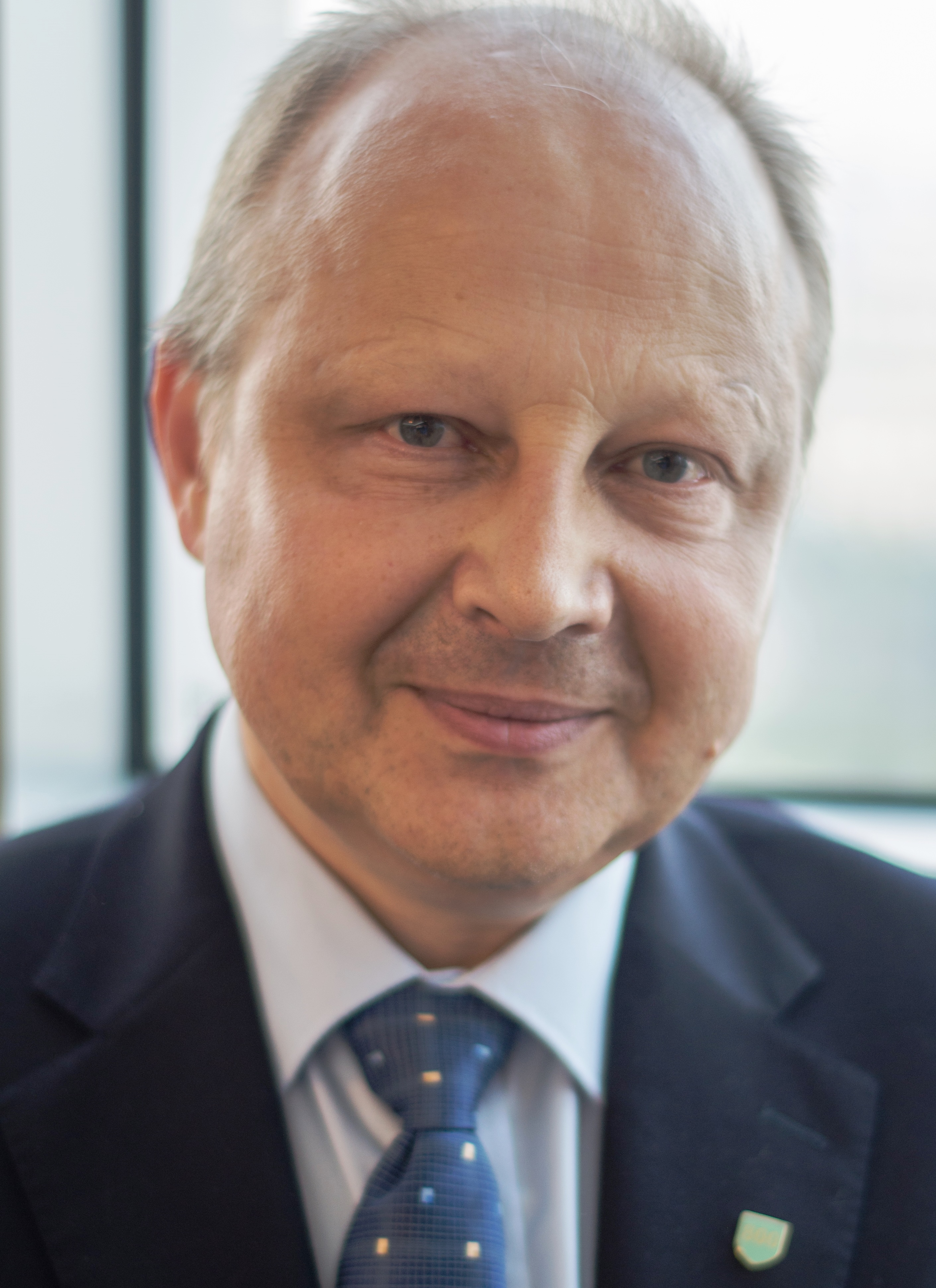
Eugene Terentjev in 2016

Eugene M. Terentjev (born 21 June 1959) is professor of Polymer physics at the University of Cambridge, and fellow of Queens' College where he is the Director of Studies in Natural Sciences.

Terentjev earned his MSc in physics from Moscow State University, and his PhD from Institute of Crystallography, Russian Academy of Sciences, Moscow. He then carried out postdoctoral research at Case Western Reserve University in Cleveland, Ohio, before moving to Cambridge in 1992. Terentjev's h-index is over 83, with over 26000 citations to his articles. His most notable contributions are in the scientific field of liquid crystal elastomers, and in biophysics.

== Selected publications ==
- "Liquid crystal elastomers: 30 years after" E.M. Terentjev: Macromolecules, 58, 2792-2806 (2025).
- "Mechanism of pressure-sensitive adhesion in nematic elastomers" H. Guo, M.O. Saed, E.M. Terentjev: Macromolecules 56, 6247-6255 (2023).
- "F1 rotary motor of ATP synthase is driven by the torsionally asymmetric drive shaft." O. Kulish, A.D. Wright, E.M. Terentjev: Sci. Rep., 6, 28180 (2016).
- "How cells feel: stochastic model for a molecular mechanosensor." M. Escude, M.K. Rigozzi, E.M. Terentjev: Biophys. J., 106, 124–133 (2014).
- "Mouldable liquid-crystalline elastomer actuators with exchangeable covalent bonds." Z. Pei, Y. Yang, Q. Chen, E.M. Terentjev, Y.Wei, Y. Ji: Nature Mater. 13, 36-41 (2013).
- "A chain mechanism for flagellum growth." L.D.B. Evans, S. Poulter, E.M. Terentjev, C. Hughes, G.M. Fraser: Nature, 504, 287-290 (2013).
- "Strength of nanotubes, filaments and nanowires from sonication-induced scission." Y.Y. Huang, T.P.J. Knowles and E.M. Terentjev: Adv. Mater. 21, 1–4 (2009).
- "Photo-mechanical actuation in polymer-nanotube composites." S.V. Ahir, E.M. Terentjev: Nature Mater. 4, 491–495 (2005).
